

206001–206100 

|-bgcolor=#E9E9E9
| 206001 ||  || — || August 5, 2002 || Campo Imperatore || CINEOS || — || align=right | 2.1 km || 
|-id=002 bgcolor=#E9E9E9
| 206002 ||  || — || August 10, 2002 || Socorro || LINEAR || 526 || align=right | 4.3 km || 
|-id=003 bgcolor=#E9E9E9
| 206003 ||  || — || August 3, 2002 || Palomar || NEAT || BAR || align=right | 2.6 km || 
|-id=004 bgcolor=#d6d6d6
| 206004 ||  || — || August 11, 2002 || Socorro || LINEAR || — || align=right | 5.0 km || 
|-id=005 bgcolor=#E9E9E9
| 206005 ||  || — || August 14, 2002 || Socorro || LINEAR || — || align=right | 3.9 km || 
|-id=006 bgcolor=#E9E9E9
| 206006 ||  || — || August 14, 2002 || Socorro || LINEAR || — || align=right | 3.7 km || 
|-id=007 bgcolor=#E9E9E9
| 206007 ||  || — || August 14, 2002 || Socorro || LINEAR || — || align=right | 3.3 km || 
|-id=008 bgcolor=#d6d6d6
| 206008 ||  || — || August 13, 2002 || Socorro || LINEAR || — || align=right | 3.9 km || 
|-id=009 bgcolor=#E9E9E9
| 206009 ||  || — || August 14, 2002 || Socorro || LINEAR || — || align=right | 1.5 km || 
|-id=010 bgcolor=#d6d6d6
| 206010 ||  || — || August 13, 2002 || Anderson Mesa || LONEOS || — || align=right | 6.2 km || 
|-id=011 bgcolor=#E9E9E9
| 206011 ||  || — || August 14, 2002 || Socorro || LINEAR || — || align=right | 2.4 km || 
|-id=012 bgcolor=#E9E9E9
| 206012 ||  || — || August 14, 2002 || Socorro || LINEAR || — || align=right | 3.2 km || 
|-id=013 bgcolor=#E9E9E9
| 206013 ||  || — || August 15, 2002 || Kitt Peak || Spacewatch || — || align=right | 1.6 km || 
|-id=014 bgcolor=#E9E9E9
| 206014 ||  || — || August 13, 2002 || Socorro || LINEAR || — || align=right | 3.2 km || 
|-id=015 bgcolor=#E9E9E9
| 206015 ||  || — || August 9, 2002 || Cerro Tololo || M. W. Buie || — || align=right | 3.2 km || 
|-id=016 bgcolor=#E9E9E9
| 206016 ||  || — || August 8, 2002 || Palomar || NEAT || — || align=right | 3.6 km || 
|-id=017 bgcolor=#E9E9E9
| 206017 ||  || — || August 8, 2002 || Palomar || S. F. Hönig || — || align=right | 4.4 km || 
|-id=018 bgcolor=#E9E9E9
| 206018 ||  || — || August 8, 2002 || Palomar || S. F. Hönig || — || align=right | 3.9 km || 
|-id=019 bgcolor=#E9E9E9
| 206019 ||  || — || August 8, 2002 || Palomar || S. F. Hönig || — || align=right | 1.7 km || 
|-id=020 bgcolor=#E9E9E9
| 206020 ||  || — || August 8, 2002 || Palomar || A. Lowe || MAR || align=right | 1.4 km || 
|-id=021 bgcolor=#E9E9E9
| 206021 ||  || — || August 11, 2002 || Palomar || NEAT || — || align=right | 2.4 km || 
|-id=022 bgcolor=#d6d6d6
| 206022 ||  || — || August 15, 2002 || Palomar || NEAT || — || align=right | 2.5 km || 
|-id=023 bgcolor=#d6d6d6
| 206023 ||  || — || August 15, 2002 || Palomar || NEAT || KAR || align=right | 1.5 km || 
|-id=024 bgcolor=#E9E9E9
| 206024 ||  || — || August 8, 2002 || Palomar || NEAT || — || align=right | 1.8 km || 
|-id=025 bgcolor=#E9E9E9
| 206025 ||  || — || August 8, 2002 || Palomar || NEAT || — || align=right | 2.8 km || 
|-id=026 bgcolor=#E9E9E9
| 206026 ||  || — || August 15, 2002 || Palomar || NEAT || — || align=right | 2.5 km || 
|-id=027 bgcolor=#fefefe
| 206027 ||  || — || August 15, 2002 || Palomar || NEAT || NYS || align=right data-sort-value="0.90" | 900 m || 
|-id=028 bgcolor=#E9E9E9
| 206028 ||  || — || August 16, 2002 || Haleakala || NEAT || — || align=right | 2.1 km || 
|-id=029 bgcolor=#E9E9E9
| 206029 ||  || — || August 16, 2002 || Haleakala || NEAT || — || align=right | 1.6 km || 
|-id=030 bgcolor=#E9E9E9
| 206030 ||  || — || August 16, 2002 || Haleakala || NEAT || — || align=right | 3.6 km || 
|-id=031 bgcolor=#E9E9E9
| 206031 ||  || — || August 16, 2002 || Palomar || NEAT || NEM || align=right | 3.8 km || 
|-id=032 bgcolor=#E9E9E9
| 206032 ||  || — || August 16, 2002 || Palomar || NEAT || — || align=right | 2.4 km || 
|-id=033 bgcolor=#E9E9E9
| 206033 ||  || — || August 16, 2002 || Palomar || NEAT || — || align=right | 2.3 km || 
|-id=034 bgcolor=#E9E9E9
| 206034 ||  || — || August 16, 2002 || Palomar || NEAT || — || align=right | 3.2 km || 
|-id=035 bgcolor=#E9E9E9
| 206035 ||  || — || August 26, 2002 || Palomar || NEAT || — || align=right | 3.5 km || 
|-id=036 bgcolor=#E9E9E9
| 206036 ||  || — || August 28, 2002 || Palomar || NEAT || AGN || align=right | 1.5 km || 
|-id=037 bgcolor=#E9E9E9
| 206037 ||  || — || August 28, 2002 || Palomar || NEAT || — || align=right | 3.4 km || 
|-id=038 bgcolor=#E9E9E9
| 206038 ||  || — || August 29, 2002 || Palomar || NEAT || — || align=right | 2.5 km || 
|-id=039 bgcolor=#E9E9E9
| 206039 ||  || — || August 29, 2002 || Palomar || NEAT || ADE || align=right | 3.9 km || 
|-id=040 bgcolor=#E9E9E9
| 206040 ||  || — || August 30, 2002 || Palomar || NEAT || MAR || align=right | 2.2 km || 
|-id=041 bgcolor=#E9E9E9
| 206041 ||  || — || August 28, 2002 || Palomar || NEAT || — || align=right | 3.2 km || 
|-id=042 bgcolor=#E9E9E9
| 206042 ||  || — || August 17, 2002 || Palomar || NEAT || — || align=right | 1.3 km || 
|-id=043 bgcolor=#E9E9E9
| 206043 ||  || — || August 29, 2002 || Palomar || NEAT || — || align=right | 1.9 km || 
|-id=044 bgcolor=#E9E9E9
| 206044 ||  || — || August 17, 2002 || Palomar || NEAT || — || align=right | 2.1 km || 
|-id=045 bgcolor=#d6d6d6
| 206045 ||  || — || August 18, 2002 || Palomar || NEAT || 615 || align=right | 1.8 km || 
|-id=046 bgcolor=#E9E9E9
| 206046 ||  || — || August 18, 2002 || Palomar || NEAT || HEN || align=right | 1.2 km || 
|-id=047 bgcolor=#E9E9E9
| 206047 ||  || — || August 17, 2002 || Palomar || NEAT || AEO || align=right | 1.4 km || 
|-id=048 bgcolor=#E9E9E9
| 206048 ||  || — || August 30, 2002 || Palomar || NEAT || — || align=right | 2.8 km || 
|-id=049 bgcolor=#E9E9E9
| 206049 ||  || — || August 17, 2002 || Palomar || NEAT || HOF || align=right | 3.5 km || 
|-id=050 bgcolor=#E9E9E9
| 206050 ||  || — || August 16, 2002 || Palomar || NEAT || WIT || align=right | 1.7 km || 
|-id=051 bgcolor=#E9E9E9
| 206051 ||  || — || August 16, 2002 || Palomar || NEAT || — || align=right | 2.5 km || 
|-id=052 bgcolor=#E9E9E9
| 206052 ||  || — || August 17, 2002 || Palomar || NEAT || — || align=right | 2.1 km || 
|-id=053 bgcolor=#E9E9E9
| 206053 ||  || — || August 27, 2002 || Palomar || NEAT || — || align=right | 2.6 km || 
|-id=054 bgcolor=#E9E9E9
| 206054 ||  || — || August 27, 2002 || Palomar || NEAT || GEF || align=right | 2.1 km || 
|-id=055 bgcolor=#E9E9E9
| 206055 ||  || — || August 18, 2002 || Palomar || NEAT || — || align=right | 1.7 km || 
|-id=056 bgcolor=#E9E9E9
| 206056 ||  || — || August 18, 2002 || Palomar || NEAT || — || align=right | 2.4 km || 
|-id=057 bgcolor=#E9E9E9
| 206057 ||  || — || August 18, 2002 || Palomar || NEAT || — || align=right | 2.7 km || 
|-id=058 bgcolor=#E9E9E9
| 206058 ||  || — || August 17, 2002 || Palomar || NEAT || HEN || align=right | 1.3 km || 
|-id=059 bgcolor=#d6d6d6
| 206059 ||  || — || August 26, 2002 || Palomar || NEAT || — || align=right | 3.9 km || 
|-id=060 bgcolor=#E9E9E9
| 206060 ||  || — || August 17, 2002 || Palomar || NEAT || NEM || align=right | 2.7 km || 
|-id=061 bgcolor=#E9E9E9
| 206061 ||  || — || August 28, 2002 || Palomar || NEAT || WIT || align=right | 1.4 km || 
|-id=062 bgcolor=#E9E9E9
| 206062 ||  || — || August 16, 2002 || Palomar || NEAT || — || align=right | 2.9 km || 
|-id=063 bgcolor=#E9E9E9
| 206063 ||  || — || August 18, 2002 || Palomar || NEAT || — || align=right | 2.2 km || 
|-id=064 bgcolor=#E9E9E9
| 206064 ||  || — || August 29, 2002 || Palomar || NEAT || — || align=right | 3.0 km || 
|-id=065 bgcolor=#E9E9E9
| 206065 ||  || — || August 30, 2002 || Palomar || NEAT || HEN || align=right | 1.8 km || 
|-id=066 bgcolor=#E9E9E9
| 206066 ||  || — || August 17, 2002 || Palomar || NEAT || — || align=right | 2.9 km || 
|-id=067 bgcolor=#E9E9E9
| 206067 ||  || — || August 18, 2002 || Palomar || NEAT || — || align=right | 1.4 km || 
|-id=068 bgcolor=#fefefe
| 206068 ||  || — || September 4, 2002 || Anderson Mesa || LONEOS || NYS || align=right | 1.2 km || 
|-id=069 bgcolor=#E9E9E9
| 206069 ||  || — || September 3, 2002 || Palomar || NEAT || — || align=right | 2.7 km || 
|-id=070 bgcolor=#E9E9E9
| 206070 ||  || — || September 3, 2002 || Haleakala || NEAT || — || align=right | 2.7 km || 
|-id=071 bgcolor=#E9E9E9
| 206071 ||  || — || September 4, 2002 || Palomar || NEAT || AGN || align=right | 1.9 km || 
|-id=072 bgcolor=#E9E9E9
| 206072 ||  || — || September 4, 2002 || Anderson Mesa || LONEOS || AGN || align=right | 1.6 km || 
|-id=073 bgcolor=#fefefe
| 206073 ||  || — || September 3, 2002 || Haleakala || NEAT || H || align=right | 1.2 km || 
|-id=074 bgcolor=#E9E9E9
| 206074 ||  || — || September 5, 2002 || Socorro || LINEAR || — || align=right | 3.7 km || 
|-id=075 bgcolor=#d6d6d6
| 206075 ||  || — || September 5, 2002 || Socorro || LINEAR || — || align=right | 4.8 km || 
|-id=076 bgcolor=#E9E9E9
| 206076 ||  || — || September 5, 2002 || Socorro || LINEAR || — || align=right | 3.1 km || 
|-id=077 bgcolor=#E9E9E9
| 206077 ||  || — || September 5, 2002 || Anderson Mesa || LONEOS || MRX || align=right | 1.6 km || 
|-id=078 bgcolor=#E9E9E9
| 206078 ||  || — || September 5, 2002 || Socorro || LINEAR || — || align=right | 5.0 km || 
|-id=079 bgcolor=#d6d6d6
| 206079 ||  || — || September 3, 2002 || Palomar || NEAT || — || align=right | 4.0 km || 
|-id=080 bgcolor=#E9E9E9
| 206080 ||  || — || September 4, 2002 || Anderson Mesa || LONEOS || — || align=right | 4.2 km || 
|-id=081 bgcolor=#E9E9E9
| 206081 ||  || — || September 5, 2002 || Socorro || LINEAR || — || align=right | 2.6 km || 
|-id=082 bgcolor=#E9E9E9
| 206082 ||  || — || September 5, 2002 || Socorro || LINEAR || — || align=right | 3.9 km || 
|-id=083 bgcolor=#E9E9E9
| 206083 ||  || — || September 5, 2002 || Socorro || LINEAR || AGN || align=right | 1.9 km || 
|-id=084 bgcolor=#E9E9E9
| 206084 ||  || — || September 5, 2002 || Socorro || LINEAR || IAN || align=right | 2.3 km || 
|-id=085 bgcolor=#d6d6d6
| 206085 ||  || — || September 5, 2002 || Anderson Mesa || LONEOS || TRP || align=right | 7.7 km || 
|-id=086 bgcolor=#d6d6d6
| 206086 ||  || — || September 9, 2002 || Haleakala || NEAT || — || align=right | 4.6 km || 
|-id=087 bgcolor=#E9E9E9
| 206087 ||  || — || September 11, 2002 || Haleakala || NEAT || — || align=right | 2.6 km || 
|-id=088 bgcolor=#E9E9E9
| 206088 ||  || — || September 10, 2002 || Palomar || NEAT || GEF || align=right | 2.5 km || 
|-id=089 bgcolor=#E9E9E9
| 206089 ||  || — || September 10, 2002 || Palomar || NEAT || EUN || align=right | 1.9 km || 
|-id=090 bgcolor=#E9E9E9
| 206090 ||  || — || September 10, 2002 || Palomar || NEAT || GEF || align=right | 2.0 km || 
|-id=091 bgcolor=#E9E9E9
| 206091 ||  || — || September 10, 2002 || Palomar || NEAT || GEF || align=right | 1.8 km || 
|-id=092 bgcolor=#E9E9E9
| 206092 ||  || — || September 11, 2002 || Palomar || NEAT || — || align=right | 3.6 km || 
|-id=093 bgcolor=#E9E9E9
| 206093 ||  || — || September 12, 2002 || Palomar || NEAT || — || align=right | 3.4 km || 
|-id=094 bgcolor=#E9E9E9
| 206094 ||  || — || September 11, 2002 || Palomar || NEAT || NEM || align=right | 3.7 km || 
|-id=095 bgcolor=#E9E9E9
| 206095 ||  || — || September 11, 2002 || Palomar || NEAT || HOF || align=right | 3.6 km || 
|-id=096 bgcolor=#E9E9E9
| 206096 ||  || — || September 11, 2002 || Palomar || NEAT || PAD || align=right | 3.6 km || 
|-id=097 bgcolor=#E9E9E9
| 206097 ||  || — || September 12, 2002 || Palomar || NEAT || — || align=right | 3.2 km || 
|-id=098 bgcolor=#E9E9E9
| 206098 ||  || — || September 13, 2002 || Kitt Peak || Spacewatch || DOR || align=right | 4.2 km || 
|-id=099 bgcolor=#E9E9E9
| 206099 ||  || — || September 13, 2002 || Palomar || NEAT || VIB || align=right | 4.1 km || 
|-id=100 bgcolor=#E9E9E9
| 206100 ||  || — || September 14, 2002 || Haleakala || NEAT || — || align=right | 2.3 km || 
|}

206101–206200 

|-bgcolor=#E9E9E9
| 206101 ||  || — || September 11, 2002 || Haleakala || NEAT || — || align=right | 4.7 km || 
|-id=102 bgcolor=#d6d6d6
| 206102 ||  || — || September 12, 2002 || Palomar || NEAT || EOS || align=right | 3.3 km || 
|-id=103 bgcolor=#E9E9E9
| 206103 ||  || — || September 14, 2002 || Palomar || NEAT || — || align=right | 3.2 km || 
|-id=104 bgcolor=#E9E9E9
| 206104 ||  || — || September 14, 2002 || Palomar || NEAT || — || align=right | 3.0 km || 
|-id=105 bgcolor=#fefefe
| 206105 ||  || — || September 15, 2002 || Palomar || NEAT || H || align=right | 1.2 km || 
|-id=106 bgcolor=#d6d6d6
| 206106 ||  || — || September 12, 2002 || Palomar || NEAT || — || align=right | 4.0 km || 
|-id=107 bgcolor=#E9E9E9
| 206107 ||  || — || September 12, 2002 || Palomar || NEAT || — || align=right | 2.3 km || 
|-id=108 bgcolor=#d6d6d6
| 206108 ||  || — || September 14, 2002 || Palomar || NEAT || THM || align=right | 2.3 km || 
|-id=109 bgcolor=#E9E9E9
| 206109 ||  || — || September 13, 2002 || Socorro || LINEAR || — || align=right | 1.6 km || 
|-id=110 bgcolor=#d6d6d6
| 206110 ||  || — || September 13, 2002 || Socorro || LINEAR || — || align=right | 3.3 km || 
|-id=111 bgcolor=#E9E9E9
| 206111 ||  || — || September 15, 2002 || Palomar || NEAT || AGN || align=right | 1.7 km || 
|-id=112 bgcolor=#E9E9E9
| 206112 ||  || — || September 14, 2002 || Palomar || R. Matson || — || align=right | 2.0 km || 
|-id=113 bgcolor=#E9E9E9
| 206113 ||  || — || September 14, 2002 || Palomar || R. Matson || HOF || align=right | 3.5 km || 
|-id=114 bgcolor=#E9E9E9
| 206114 ||  || — || September 15, 2002 || Palomar || R. Matson || AGN || align=right | 1.3 km || 
|-id=115 bgcolor=#E9E9E9
| 206115 ||  || — || September 14, 2002 || Palomar || NEAT || MRX || align=right | 1.5 km || 
|-id=116 bgcolor=#E9E9E9
| 206116 ||  || — || September 15, 2002 || Palomar || NEAT || HNS || align=right | 1.6 km || 
|-id=117 bgcolor=#E9E9E9
| 206117 ||  || — || September 14, 2002 || Palomar || NEAT || AST || align=right | 2.9 km || 
|-id=118 bgcolor=#d6d6d6
| 206118 ||  || — || September 14, 2002 || Palomar || NEAT || K-2 || align=right | 1.7 km || 
|-id=119 bgcolor=#d6d6d6
| 206119 ||  || — || September 13, 2002 || Palomar || NEAT || HYG || align=right | 3.6 km || 
|-id=120 bgcolor=#E9E9E9
| 206120 ||  || — || September 14, 2002 || Palomar || NEAT || — || align=right | 1.8 km || 
|-id=121 bgcolor=#E9E9E9
| 206121 ||  || — || September 4, 2002 || Palomar || NEAT || — || align=right | 1.7 km || 
|-id=122 bgcolor=#E9E9E9
| 206122 ||  || — || September 14, 2002 || Palomar || NEAT || HEN || align=right | 1.1 km || 
|-id=123 bgcolor=#E9E9E9
| 206123 ||  || — || September 14, 2002 || Palomar || NEAT || — || align=right | 2.6 km || 
|-id=124 bgcolor=#fefefe
| 206124 ||  || — || September 27, 2002 || Palomar || NEAT || H || align=right data-sort-value="0.72" | 720 m || 
|-id=125 bgcolor=#d6d6d6
| 206125 ||  || — || September 27, 2002 || Palomar || NEAT || — || align=right | 3.5 km || 
|-id=126 bgcolor=#E9E9E9
| 206126 ||  || — || September 27, 2002 || Palomar || NEAT || AGN || align=right | 1.8 km || 
|-id=127 bgcolor=#E9E9E9
| 206127 ||  || — || September 27, 2002 || Palomar || NEAT || — || align=right | 3.4 km || 
|-id=128 bgcolor=#d6d6d6
| 206128 ||  || — || September 30, 2002 || Haleakala || NEAT || — || align=right | 3.5 km || 
|-id=129 bgcolor=#d6d6d6
| 206129 ||  || — || September 29, 2002 || Kitt Peak || Spacewatch || — || align=right | 3.5 km || 
|-id=130 bgcolor=#d6d6d6
| 206130 ||  || — || September 17, 2002 || Palomar || NEAT || EOS || align=right | 3.6 km || 
|-id=131 bgcolor=#d6d6d6
| 206131 ||  || — || September 30, 2002 || Socorro || LINEAR || JLI || align=right | 5.1 km || 
|-id=132 bgcolor=#E9E9E9
| 206132 ||  || — || September 16, 2002 || Palomar || NEAT || HOF || align=right | 4.8 km || 
|-id=133 bgcolor=#fefefe
| 206133 ||  || — || September 28, 2002 || Palomar || NEAT || H || align=right data-sort-value="0.75" | 750 m || 
|-id=134 bgcolor=#E9E9E9
| 206134 ||  || — || September 26, 2002 || Palomar || NEAT || AGN || align=right | 1.6 km || 
|-id=135 bgcolor=#d6d6d6
| 206135 ||  || — || October 1, 2002 || Anderson Mesa || LONEOS || — || align=right | 4.1 km || 
|-id=136 bgcolor=#d6d6d6
| 206136 ||  || — || October 1, 2002 || Socorro || LINEAR || — || align=right | 5.4 km || 
|-id=137 bgcolor=#E9E9E9
| 206137 ||  || — || October 1, 2002 || Anderson Mesa || LONEOS || WIT || align=right | 1.7 km || 
|-id=138 bgcolor=#E9E9E9
| 206138 ||  || — || October 2, 2002 || Socorro || LINEAR || — || align=right | 3.2 km || 
|-id=139 bgcolor=#d6d6d6
| 206139 ||  || — || October 2, 2002 || Socorro || LINEAR || EOS || align=right | 6.4 km || 
|-id=140 bgcolor=#d6d6d6
| 206140 ||  || — || October 2, 2002 || Socorro || LINEAR || — || align=right | 5.7 km || 
|-id=141 bgcolor=#d6d6d6
| 206141 ||  || — || October 4, 2002 || Fountain Hills || C. W. Juels, P. R. Holvorcem || EOS || align=right | 3.8 km || 
|-id=142 bgcolor=#d6d6d6
| 206142 ||  || — || October 4, 2002 || Campo Imperatore || CINEOS || — || align=right | 2.8 km || 
|-id=143 bgcolor=#d6d6d6
| 206143 ||  || — || October 2, 2002 || Haleakala || NEAT || — || align=right | 4.2 km || 
|-id=144 bgcolor=#d6d6d6
| 206144 ||  || — || October 3, 2002 || Socorro || LINEAR || — || align=right | 3.1 km || 
|-id=145 bgcolor=#E9E9E9
| 206145 ||  || — || October 3, 2002 || Socorro || LINEAR || — || align=right | 3.1 km || 
|-id=146 bgcolor=#d6d6d6
| 206146 ||  || — || October 2, 2002 || Socorro || LINEAR || KOR || align=right | 1.7 km || 
|-id=147 bgcolor=#d6d6d6
| 206147 ||  || — || October 3, 2002 || Socorro || LINEAR || — || align=right | 3.5 km || 
|-id=148 bgcolor=#d6d6d6
| 206148 ||  || — || October 4, 2002 || Socorro || LINEAR || — || align=right | 5.2 km || 
|-id=149 bgcolor=#d6d6d6
| 206149 ||  || — || October 3, 2002 || Palomar || NEAT || — || align=right | 3.2 km || 
|-id=150 bgcolor=#E9E9E9
| 206150 ||  || — || October 4, 2002 || Palomar || NEAT || — || align=right | 1.9 km || 
|-id=151 bgcolor=#E9E9E9
| 206151 ||  || — || October 4, 2002 || Palomar || NEAT || — || align=right | 3.0 km || 
|-id=152 bgcolor=#E9E9E9
| 206152 ||  || — || October 4, 2002 || Palomar || NEAT || GEF || align=right | 2.5 km || 
|-id=153 bgcolor=#E9E9E9
| 206153 ||  || — || October 4, 2002 || Anderson Mesa || LONEOS || — || align=right | 4.2 km || 
|-id=154 bgcolor=#d6d6d6
| 206154 ||  || — || October 4, 2002 || Socorro || LINEAR || HYG || align=right | 3.9 km || 
|-id=155 bgcolor=#E9E9E9
| 206155 ||  || — || October 5, 2002 || Palomar || NEAT || GEF || align=right | 1.7 km || 
|-id=156 bgcolor=#d6d6d6
| 206156 ||  || — || October 3, 2002 || Palomar || NEAT || — || align=right | 5.1 km || 
|-id=157 bgcolor=#d6d6d6
| 206157 ||  || — || October 5, 2002 || Socorro || LINEAR || — || align=right | 4.7 km || 
|-id=158 bgcolor=#d6d6d6
| 206158 ||  || — || October 14, 2002 || Socorro || LINEAR || — || align=right | 4.6 km || 
|-id=159 bgcolor=#E9E9E9
| 206159 ||  || — || October 4, 2002 || Socorro || LINEAR || — || align=right | 2.6 km || 
|-id=160 bgcolor=#d6d6d6
| 206160 ||  || — || October 4, 2002 || Socorro || LINEAR || — || align=right | 5.8 km || 
|-id=161 bgcolor=#d6d6d6
| 206161 ||  || — || October 5, 2002 || Anderson Mesa || LONEOS || — || align=right | 5.8 km || 
|-id=162 bgcolor=#d6d6d6
| 206162 ||  || — || October 4, 2002 || Socorro || LINEAR || — || align=right | 6.6 km || 
|-id=163 bgcolor=#d6d6d6
| 206163 ||  || — || October 5, 2002 || Socorro || LINEAR || — || align=right | 4.3 km || 
|-id=164 bgcolor=#d6d6d6
| 206164 ||  || — || October 7, 2002 || Socorro || LINEAR || — || align=right | 3.4 km || 
|-id=165 bgcolor=#d6d6d6
| 206165 ||  || — || October 6, 2002 || Socorro || LINEAR || — || align=right | 6.4 km || 
|-id=166 bgcolor=#d6d6d6
| 206166 ||  || — || October 9, 2002 || Anderson Mesa || LONEOS || TIR || align=right | 4.3 km || 
|-id=167 bgcolor=#E9E9E9
| 206167 ||  || — || October 9, 2002 || Socorro || LINEAR || — || align=right | 3.5 km || 
|-id=168 bgcolor=#E9E9E9
| 206168 ||  || — || October 7, 2002 || Socorro || LINEAR || — || align=right | 1.7 km || 
|-id=169 bgcolor=#d6d6d6
| 206169 ||  || — || October 7, 2002 || Socorro || LINEAR || — || align=right | 3.3 km || 
|-id=170 bgcolor=#d6d6d6
| 206170 ||  || — || October 8, 2002 || Anderson Mesa || LONEOS || — || align=right | 4.5 km || 
|-id=171 bgcolor=#d6d6d6
| 206171 ||  || — || October 9, 2002 || Socorro || LINEAR || — || align=right | 3.5 km || 
|-id=172 bgcolor=#d6d6d6
| 206172 ||  || — || October 10, 2002 || Palomar || NEAT || KAR || align=right | 1.6 km || 
|-id=173 bgcolor=#E9E9E9
| 206173 ||  || — || October 9, 2002 || Socorro || LINEAR || — || align=right | 4.1 km || 
|-id=174 bgcolor=#d6d6d6
| 206174 ||  || — || October 10, 2002 || Socorro || LINEAR || EOS || align=right | 3.4 km || 
|-id=175 bgcolor=#d6d6d6
| 206175 ||  || — || October 10, 2002 || Socorro || LINEAR || — || align=right | 7.1 km || 
|-id=176 bgcolor=#fefefe
| 206176 ||  || — || October 9, 2002 || Socorro || LINEAR || H || align=right | 1.4 km || 
|-id=177 bgcolor=#d6d6d6
| 206177 ||  || — || October 13, 2002 || Palomar || NEAT || — || align=right | 4.7 km || 
|-id=178 bgcolor=#d6d6d6
| 206178 ||  || — || October 13, 2002 || Palomar || NEAT || — || align=right | 7.4 km || 
|-id=179 bgcolor=#d6d6d6
| 206179 ||  || — || October 13, 2002 || Palomar || NEAT || — || align=right | 6.0 km || 
|-id=180 bgcolor=#E9E9E9
| 206180 ||  || — || October 4, 2002 || Apache Point || SDSS || WIT || align=right | 1.6 km || 
|-id=181 bgcolor=#d6d6d6
| 206181 ||  || — || October 4, 2002 || Apache Point || SDSS || TEL || align=right | 2.1 km || 
|-id=182 bgcolor=#d6d6d6
| 206182 ||  || — || October 4, 2002 || Apache Point || SDSS || — || align=right | 5.9 km || 
|-id=183 bgcolor=#d6d6d6
| 206183 ||  || — || October 4, 2002 || Apache Point || SDSS || — || align=right | 5.9 km || 
|-id=184 bgcolor=#E9E9E9
| 206184 ||  || — || October 5, 2002 || Apache Point || SDSS || — || align=right | 2.2 km || 
|-id=185 bgcolor=#E9E9E9
| 206185 Yip ||  ||  || October 5, 2002 || Apache Point || SDSS || — || align=right | 2.7 km || 
|-id=186 bgcolor=#E9E9E9
| 206186 ||  || — || October 5, 2002 || Apache Point || SDSS || AGN || align=right | 1.3 km || 
|-id=187 bgcolor=#d6d6d6
| 206187 ||  || — || October 10, 2002 || Apache Point || SDSS || KOR || align=right | 1.6 km || 
|-id=188 bgcolor=#d6d6d6
| 206188 ||  || — || October 2, 2002 || Socorro || LINEAR || CHA || align=right | 3.7 km || 
|-id=189 bgcolor=#d6d6d6
| 206189 ||  || — || October 5, 2002 || Socorro || LINEAR || — || align=right | 4.1 km || 
|-id=190 bgcolor=#E9E9E9
| 206190 ||  || — || October 3, 2002 || Socorro || LINEAR || AGN || align=right | 1.8 km || 
|-id=191 bgcolor=#d6d6d6
| 206191 ||  || — || October 15, 2002 || Palomar || NEAT || — || align=right | 4.4 km || 
|-id=192 bgcolor=#d6d6d6
| 206192 ||  || — || October 28, 2002 || Socorro || LINEAR || EUP || align=right | 5.2 km || 
|-id=193 bgcolor=#E9E9E9
| 206193 ||  || — || October 28, 2002 || Palomar || NEAT || — || align=right | 4.2 km || 
|-id=194 bgcolor=#d6d6d6
| 206194 ||  || — || October 28, 2002 || Palomar || NEAT || TRP || align=right | 4.4 km || 
|-id=195 bgcolor=#d6d6d6
| 206195 ||  || — || October 28, 2002 || Palomar || NEAT || — || align=right | 6.2 km || 
|-id=196 bgcolor=#d6d6d6
| 206196 ||  || — || October 28, 2002 || Socorro || LINEAR || — || align=right | 5.7 km || 
|-id=197 bgcolor=#d6d6d6
| 206197 ||  || — || October 30, 2002 || Palomar || NEAT || — || align=right | 3.5 km || 
|-id=198 bgcolor=#d6d6d6
| 206198 ||  || — || October 28, 2002 || Palomar || NEAT || HYG || align=right | 4.5 km || 
|-id=199 bgcolor=#d6d6d6
| 206199 ||  || — || October 30, 2002 || Haleakala || NEAT || TIR || align=right | 4.8 km || 
|-id=200 bgcolor=#d6d6d6
| 206200 ||  || — || October 31, 2002 || Socorro || LINEAR || EUP || align=right | 8.3 km || 
|}

206201–206300 

|-bgcolor=#E9E9E9
| 206201 ||  || — || October 30, 2002 || Haleakala || NEAT || — || align=right | 1.4 km || 
|-id=202 bgcolor=#d6d6d6
| 206202 ||  || — || October 31, 2002 || Anderson Mesa || LONEOS || — || align=right | 3.5 km || 
|-id=203 bgcolor=#d6d6d6
| 206203 ||  || — || October 31, 2002 || Anderson Mesa || LONEOS || THM || align=right | 4.1 km || 
|-id=204 bgcolor=#d6d6d6
| 206204 ||  || — || October 31, 2002 || Palomar || NEAT || — || align=right | 5.3 km || 
|-id=205 bgcolor=#d6d6d6
| 206205 ||  || — || October 31, 2002 || Socorro || LINEAR || — || align=right | 4.9 km || 
|-id=206 bgcolor=#d6d6d6
| 206206 ||  || — || October 31, 2002 || Socorro || LINEAR || — || align=right | 3.8 km || 
|-id=207 bgcolor=#d6d6d6
| 206207 ||  || — || October 20, 2002 || Palomar || NEAT || — || align=right | 4.9 km || 
|-id=208 bgcolor=#d6d6d6
| 206208 ||  || — || October 31, 2002 || Palomar || NEAT || — || align=right | 2.7 km || 
|-id=209 bgcolor=#d6d6d6
| 206209 ||  || — || November 1, 2002 || Palomar || NEAT || — || align=right | 4.6 km || 
|-id=210 bgcolor=#d6d6d6
| 206210 ||  || — || November 5, 2002 || Socorro || LINEAR || — || align=right | 5.0 km || 
|-id=211 bgcolor=#d6d6d6
| 206211 ||  || — || November 5, 2002 || Socorro || LINEAR || — || align=right | 4.5 km || 
|-id=212 bgcolor=#fefefe
| 206212 ||  || — || November 5, 2002 || Socorro || LINEAR || H || align=right | 1.1 km || 
|-id=213 bgcolor=#d6d6d6
| 206213 ||  || — || November 5, 2002 || Socorro || LINEAR || LIX || align=right | 6.2 km || 
|-id=214 bgcolor=#d6d6d6
| 206214 ||  || — || November 5, 2002 || Socorro || LINEAR || EOS || align=right | 3.5 km || 
|-id=215 bgcolor=#d6d6d6
| 206215 ||  || — || November 5, 2002 || Socorro || LINEAR || — || align=right | 6.0 km || 
|-id=216 bgcolor=#d6d6d6
| 206216 ||  || — || November 8, 2002 || Kingsnake || J. V. McClusky || — || align=right | 4.9 km || 
|-id=217 bgcolor=#d6d6d6
| 206217 ||  || — || November 5, 2002 || Palomar || NEAT || — || align=right | 5.1 km || 
|-id=218 bgcolor=#d6d6d6
| 206218 ||  || — || November 4, 2002 || Haleakala || NEAT || — || align=right | 5.4 km || 
|-id=219 bgcolor=#d6d6d6
| 206219 ||  || — || November 6, 2002 || Anderson Mesa || LONEOS || — || align=right | 5.2 km || 
|-id=220 bgcolor=#d6d6d6
| 206220 ||  || — || November 6, 2002 || Kitt Peak || Spacewatch || — || align=right | 3.1 km || 
|-id=221 bgcolor=#d6d6d6
| 206221 ||  || — || November 5, 2002 || Socorro || LINEAR || — || align=right | 3.6 km || 
|-id=222 bgcolor=#fefefe
| 206222 ||  || — || November 7, 2002 || Socorro || LINEAR || H || align=right | 1.3 km || 
|-id=223 bgcolor=#d6d6d6
| 206223 ||  || — || November 7, 2002 || Socorro || LINEAR || — || align=right | 4.8 km || 
|-id=224 bgcolor=#d6d6d6
| 206224 ||  || — || November 7, 2002 || Socorro || LINEAR || — || align=right | 4.5 km || 
|-id=225 bgcolor=#d6d6d6
| 206225 ||  || — || November 11, 2002 || Socorro || LINEAR || — || align=right | 4.8 km || 
|-id=226 bgcolor=#d6d6d6
| 206226 ||  || — || November 13, 2002 || Socorro || LINEAR || EUP || align=right | 6.4 km || 
|-id=227 bgcolor=#d6d6d6
| 206227 ||  || — || November 12, 2002 || Socorro || LINEAR || — || align=right | 6.4 km || 
|-id=228 bgcolor=#d6d6d6
| 206228 ||  || — || November 12, 2002 || Socorro || LINEAR || — || align=right | 4.4 km || 
|-id=229 bgcolor=#d6d6d6
| 206229 ||  || — || November 13, 2002 || Palomar || NEAT || — || align=right | 4.7 km || 
|-id=230 bgcolor=#d6d6d6
| 206230 ||  || — || November 12, 2002 || Anderson Mesa || LONEOS || — || align=right | 6.5 km || 
|-id=231 bgcolor=#d6d6d6
| 206231 ||  || — || November 12, 2002 || Socorro || LINEAR || — || align=right | 8.1 km || 
|-id=232 bgcolor=#d6d6d6
| 206232 ||  || — || November 14, 2002 || Socorro || LINEAR || — || align=right | 3.9 km || 
|-id=233 bgcolor=#d6d6d6
| 206233 ||  || — || November 13, 2002 || Palomar || NEAT || TEL || align=right | 2.3 km || 
|-id=234 bgcolor=#d6d6d6
| 206234 ||  || — || November 24, 2002 || Palomar || NEAT || THM || align=right | 2.8 km || 
|-id=235 bgcolor=#d6d6d6
| 206235 ||  || — || November 23, 2002 || Palomar || NEAT || — || align=right | 5.7 km || 
|-id=236 bgcolor=#d6d6d6
| 206236 ||  || — || November 24, 2002 || Palomar || NEAT || — || align=right | 4.1 km || 
|-id=237 bgcolor=#d6d6d6
| 206237 ||  || — || November 28, 2002 || Anderson Mesa || LONEOS || — || align=right | 4.0 km || 
|-id=238 bgcolor=#fefefe
| 206238 ||  || — || November 30, 2002 || Socorro || LINEAR || H || align=right | 1.1 km || 
|-id=239 bgcolor=#d6d6d6
| 206239 ||  || — || November 25, 2002 || Palomar || S. F. Hönig || KOR || align=right | 1.9 km || 
|-id=240 bgcolor=#d6d6d6
| 206240 ||  || — || November 16, 2002 || Palomar || NEAT || — || align=right | 3.2 km || 
|-id=241 bgcolor=#d6d6d6
| 206241 Dubois ||  ||  || November 24, 2002 || Palomar || NEAT || HYG || align=right | 3.4 km || 
|-id=242 bgcolor=#d6d6d6
| 206242 ||  || — || December 1, 2002 || Socorro || LINEAR || — || align=right | 4.5 km || 
|-id=243 bgcolor=#d6d6d6
| 206243 ||  || — || December 3, 2002 || Palomar || NEAT || — || align=right | 4.3 km || 
|-id=244 bgcolor=#d6d6d6
| 206244 ||  || — || December 5, 2002 || Socorro || LINEAR || — || align=right | 4.5 km || 
|-id=245 bgcolor=#d6d6d6
| 206245 ||  || — || December 5, 2002 || Socorro || LINEAR || — || align=right | 4.2 km || 
|-id=246 bgcolor=#d6d6d6
| 206246 ||  || — || December 2, 2002 || Socorro || LINEAR || — || align=right | 4.4 km || 
|-id=247 bgcolor=#d6d6d6
| 206247 ||  || — || December 3, 2002 || Palomar || NEAT || — || align=right | 6.8 km || 
|-id=248 bgcolor=#d6d6d6
| 206248 ||  || — || December 7, 2002 || Desert Eagle || W. K. Y. Yeung || — || align=right | 3.1 km || 
|-id=249 bgcolor=#d6d6d6
| 206249 ||  || — || December 7, 2002 || Socorro || LINEAR || HYG || align=right | 4.0 km || 
|-id=250 bgcolor=#d6d6d6
| 206250 ||  || — || December 7, 2002 || Socorro || LINEAR || TIR || align=right | 3.7 km || 
|-id=251 bgcolor=#d6d6d6
| 206251 ||  || — || December 8, 2002 || Haleakala || NEAT || — || align=right | 5.9 km || 
|-id=252 bgcolor=#d6d6d6
| 206252 ||  || — || December 10, 2002 || Socorro || LINEAR || — || align=right | 4.0 km || 
|-id=253 bgcolor=#FA8072
| 206253 ||  || — || December 11, 2002 || Socorro || LINEAR || — || align=right | 1.0 km || 
|-id=254 bgcolor=#d6d6d6
| 206254 ||  || — || December 12, 2002 || Socorro || LINEAR || EUP || align=right | 7.6 km || 
|-id=255 bgcolor=#d6d6d6
| 206255 ||  || — || December 12, 2002 || Palomar || NEAT || — || align=right | 5.7 km || 
|-id=256 bgcolor=#d6d6d6
| 206256 ||  || — || December 11, 2002 || Socorro || LINEAR || — || align=right | 3.9 km || 
|-id=257 bgcolor=#d6d6d6
| 206257 ||  || — || December 11, 2002 || Socorro || LINEAR || — || align=right | 4.2 km || 
|-id=258 bgcolor=#d6d6d6
| 206258 ||  || — || December 11, 2002 || Socorro || LINEAR || HYG || align=right | 4.5 km || 
|-id=259 bgcolor=#d6d6d6
| 206259 ||  || — || December 13, 2002 || Socorro || LINEAR || — || align=right | 7.6 km || 
|-id=260 bgcolor=#d6d6d6
| 206260 ||  || — || December 13, 2002 || Palomar || NEAT || — || align=right | 4.4 km || 
|-id=261 bgcolor=#d6d6d6
| 206261 ||  || — || December 14, 2002 || Socorro || LINEAR || TIR || align=right | 4.8 km || 
|-id=262 bgcolor=#d6d6d6
| 206262 ||  || — || December 14, 2002 || Kingsnake || J. V. McClusky || TIR || align=right | 4.5 km || 
|-id=263 bgcolor=#d6d6d6
| 206263 ||  || — || December 5, 2002 || Socorro || LINEAR || EOS || align=right | 2.9 km || 
|-id=264 bgcolor=#d6d6d6
| 206264 ||  || — || December 7, 2002 || Socorro || LINEAR || — || align=right | 7.4 km || 
|-id=265 bgcolor=#d6d6d6
| 206265 ||  || — || December 11, 2002 || Socorro || LINEAR || — || align=right | 5.4 km || 
|-id=266 bgcolor=#d6d6d6
| 206266 ||  || — || December 28, 2002 || Anderson Mesa || LONEOS || EUP || align=right | 6.3 km || 
|-id=267 bgcolor=#d6d6d6
| 206267 ||  || — || December 28, 2002 || Anderson Mesa || LONEOS || — || align=right | 5.9 km || 
|-id=268 bgcolor=#d6d6d6
| 206268 ||  || — || December 31, 2002 || Socorro || LINEAR || — || align=right | 5.2 km || 
|-id=269 bgcolor=#d6d6d6
| 206269 ||  || — || December 31, 2002 || Socorro || LINEAR || — || align=right | 4.2 km || 
|-id=270 bgcolor=#d6d6d6
| 206270 ||  || — || December 31, 2002 || Socorro || LINEAR || — || align=right | 4.3 km || 
|-id=271 bgcolor=#d6d6d6
| 206271 ||  || — || December 31, 2002 || Socorro || LINEAR || — || align=right | 5.2 km || 
|-id=272 bgcolor=#d6d6d6
| 206272 ||  || — || December 31, 2002 || Socorro || LINEAR || THM || align=right | 4.4 km || 
|-id=273 bgcolor=#d6d6d6
| 206273 ||  || — || December 31, 2002 || Socorro || LINEAR || TIR || align=right | 5.1 km || 
|-id=274 bgcolor=#d6d6d6
| 206274 ||  || — || December 31, 2002 || Socorro || LINEAR || — || align=right | 4.1 km || 
|-id=275 bgcolor=#d6d6d6
| 206275 ||  || — || December 30, 2002 || Socorro || LINEAR || TIR || align=right | 4.2 km || 
|-id=276 bgcolor=#d6d6d6
| 206276 ||  || — || January 1, 2003 || Socorro || LINEAR || — || align=right | 3.3 km || 
|-id=277 bgcolor=#d6d6d6
| 206277 ||  || — || January 3, 2003 || Kitt Peak || Spacewatch || — || align=right | 3.6 km || 
|-id=278 bgcolor=#d6d6d6
| 206278 ||  || — || January 5, 2003 || Anderson Mesa || LONEOS || EUP || align=right | 8.0 km || 
|-id=279 bgcolor=#d6d6d6
| 206279 ||  || — || January 5, 2003 || Socorro || LINEAR || HYG || align=right | 4.6 km || 
|-id=280 bgcolor=#d6d6d6
| 206280 ||  || — || January 5, 2003 || Socorro || LINEAR || — || align=right | 5.6 km || 
|-id=281 bgcolor=#d6d6d6
| 206281 ||  || — || January 4, 2003 || Socorro || LINEAR || — || align=right | 6.3 km || 
|-id=282 bgcolor=#d6d6d6
| 206282 ||  || — || January 5, 2003 || Socorro || LINEAR || TIR || align=right | 4.4 km || 
|-id=283 bgcolor=#d6d6d6
| 206283 ||  || — || January 7, 2003 || Socorro || LINEAR || — || align=right | 7.4 km || 
|-id=284 bgcolor=#d6d6d6
| 206284 ||  || — || January 7, 2003 || Socorro || LINEAR || — || align=right | 6.1 km || 
|-id=285 bgcolor=#d6d6d6
| 206285 ||  || — || January 8, 2003 || Socorro || LINEAR || Tj (2.91) || align=right | 6.8 km || 
|-id=286 bgcolor=#d6d6d6
| 206286 ||  || — || January 8, 2003 || Socorro || LINEAR || — || align=right | 3.0 km || 
|-id=287 bgcolor=#d6d6d6
| 206287 ||  || — || January 10, 2003 || Socorro || LINEAR || — || align=right | 4.9 km || 
|-id=288 bgcolor=#d6d6d6
| 206288 ||  || — || January 8, 2003 || Socorro || LINEAR || LIX || align=right | 6.7 km || 
|-id=289 bgcolor=#d6d6d6
| 206289 ||  || — || January 11, 2003 || Socorro || LINEAR || — || align=right | 5.6 km || 
|-id=290 bgcolor=#d6d6d6
| 206290 ||  || — || January 4, 2003 || Socorro || LINEAR || — || align=right | 3.5 km || 
|-id=291 bgcolor=#d6d6d6
| 206291 ||  || — || January 8, 2003 || Socorro || LINEAR || — || align=right | 5.9 km || 
|-id=292 bgcolor=#fefefe
| 206292 ||  || — || January 27, 2003 || Socorro || LINEAR || — || align=right | 1.3 km || 
|-id=293 bgcolor=#d6d6d6
| 206293 ||  || — || January 27, 2003 || Socorro || LINEAR || AEG || align=right | 6.0 km || 
|-id=294 bgcolor=#d6d6d6
| 206294 ||  || — || January 31, 2003 || Socorro || LINEAR || — || align=right | 5.8 km || 
|-id=295 bgcolor=#d6d6d6
| 206295 ||  || — || January 26, 2003 || Anderson Mesa || LONEOS || — || align=right | 4.6 km || 
|-id=296 bgcolor=#d6d6d6
| 206296 ||  || — || February 8, 2003 || Socorro || LINEAR || THM || align=right | 3.0 km || 
|-id=297 bgcolor=#d6d6d6
| 206297 ||  || — || February 22, 2003 || Kitt Peak || Spacewatch || ALA || align=right | 6.9 km || 
|-id=298 bgcolor=#d6d6d6
| 206298 ||  || — || February 22, 2003 || Palomar || NEAT || 7:4* || align=right | 3.3 km || 
|-id=299 bgcolor=#d6d6d6
| 206299 ||  || — || March 7, 2003 || Kitt Peak || Spacewatch || HYG || align=right | 4.0 km || 
|-id=300 bgcolor=#fefefe
| 206300 ||  || — || March 23, 2003 || Kitt Peak || Spacewatch || — || align=right | 1.3 km || 
|}

206301–206400 

|-bgcolor=#fefefe
| 206301 ||  || — || March 24, 2003 || Kitt Peak || Spacewatch || FLO || align=right | 1.1 km || 
|-id=302 bgcolor=#fefefe
| 206302 ||  || — || March 26, 2003 || Palomar || NEAT || — || align=right | 1.3 km || 
|-id=303 bgcolor=#fefefe
| 206303 || 2003 HT || — || April 21, 2003 || Kitt Peak || Spacewatch || — || align=right | 1.1 km || 
|-id=304 bgcolor=#fefefe
| 206304 ||  || — || April 24, 2003 || Anderson Mesa || LONEOS || — || align=right data-sort-value="0.87" | 870 m || 
|-id=305 bgcolor=#fefefe
| 206305 ||  || — || April 24, 2003 || Anderson Mesa || LONEOS || — || align=right | 1.7 km || 
|-id=306 bgcolor=#fefefe
| 206306 ||  || — || April 24, 2003 || Kitt Peak || Spacewatch || — || align=right | 1.3 km || 
|-id=307 bgcolor=#fefefe
| 206307 ||  || — || April 25, 2003 || Kitt Peak || Spacewatch || — || align=right | 1.6 km || 
|-id=308 bgcolor=#fefefe
| 206308 ||  || — || April 24, 2003 || Kitt Peak || Spacewatch || FLO || align=right data-sort-value="0.94" | 940 m || 
|-id=309 bgcolor=#fefefe
| 206309 ||  || — || April 28, 2003 || Anderson Mesa || LONEOS || — || align=right | 1.4 km || 
|-id=310 bgcolor=#d6d6d6
| 206310 ||  || — || April 29, 2003 || Socorro || LINEAR || 7:4* || align=right | 4.5 km || 
|-id=311 bgcolor=#fefefe
| 206311 ||  || — || April 29, 2003 || Socorro || LINEAR || FLO || align=right data-sort-value="0.94" | 940 m || 
|-id=312 bgcolor=#fefefe
| 206312 ||  || — || April 28, 2003 || Socorro || LINEAR || FLO || align=right data-sort-value="0.91" | 910 m || 
|-id=313 bgcolor=#fefefe
| 206313 ||  || — || May 1, 2003 || Socorro || LINEAR || FLO || align=right data-sort-value="0.90" | 900 m || 
|-id=314 bgcolor=#fefefe
| 206314 ||  || — || May 25, 2003 || Nogales || M. Schwartz, P. R. Holvorcem || — || align=right | 1.2 km || 
|-id=315 bgcolor=#fefefe
| 206315 ||  || — || May 25, 2003 || Anderson Mesa || LONEOS || — || align=right | 1.4 km || 
|-id=316 bgcolor=#fefefe
| 206316 ||  || — || May 21, 2003 || Anderson Mesa || LONEOS || FLO || align=right | 1.5 km || 
|-id=317 bgcolor=#fefefe
| 206317 ||  || — || May 30, 2003 || Socorro || LINEAR || — || align=right | 1.7 km || 
|-id=318 bgcolor=#fefefe
| 206318 ||  || — || June 23, 2003 || Anderson Mesa || LONEOS || — || align=right | 1.7 km || 
|-id=319 bgcolor=#fefefe
| 206319 ||  || — || June 25, 2003 || Anderson Mesa || LONEOS || — || align=right | 1.2 km || 
|-id=320 bgcolor=#fefefe
| 206320 || 2003 NT || — || July 1, 2003 || Haleakala || NEAT || — || align=right | 1.6 km || 
|-id=321 bgcolor=#E9E9E9
| 206321 ||  || — || July 8, 2003 || Palomar || NEAT || — || align=right | 4.3 km || 
|-id=322 bgcolor=#fefefe
| 206322 ||  || — || July 3, 2003 || Kitt Peak || Spacewatch || V || align=right data-sort-value="0.79" | 790 m || 
|-id=323 bgcolor=#E9E9E9
| 206323 ||  || — || July 3, 2003 || Kitt Peak || Spacewatch || — || align=right | 1.6 km || 
|-id=324 bgcolor=#fefefe
| 206324 || 2003 ON || — || July 17, 2003 || Reedy Creek || J. Broughton || — || align=right | 1.2 km || 
|-id=325 bgcolor=#fefefe
| 206325 ||  || — || July 22, 2003 || Haleakala || NEAT || NYS || align=right data-sort-value="0.91" | 910 m || 
|-id=326 bgcolor=#fefefe
| 206326 ||  || — || July 22, 2003 || Campo Imperatore || CINEOS || — || align=right | 1.1 km || 
|-id=327 bgcolor=#fefefe
| 206327 ||  || — || July 22, 2003 || Campo Imperatore || CINEOS || MAS || align=right | 1.1 km || 
|-id=328 bgcolor=#fefefe
| 206328 ||  || — || July 22, 2003 || Haleakala || NEAT || SUL || align=right | 3.0 km || 
|-id=329 bgcolor=#fefefe
| 206329 ||  || — || July 24, 2003 || Mallorca || OAM Obs. || ERI || align=right | 2.4 km || 
|-id=330 bgcolor=#fefefe
| 206330 ||  || — || July 23, 2003 || Socorro || LINEAR || ERI || align=right | 2.2 km || 
|-id=331 bgcolor=#fefefe
| 206331 ||  || — || July 26, 2003 || Reedy Creek || J. Broughton || — || align=right | 1.4 km || 
|-id=332 bgcolor=#fefefe
| 206332 ||  || — || July 23, 2003 || Palomar || NEAT || — || align=right | 2.1 km || 
|-id=333 bgcolor=#E9E9E9
| 206333 ||  || — || July 25, 2003 || Socorro || LINEAR || — || align=right | 1.3 km || 
|-id=334 bgcolor=#fefefe
| 206334 ||  || — || July 31, 2003 || Reedy Creek || J. Broughton || — || align=right | 1.0 km || 
|-id=335 bgcolor=#FA8072
| 206335 ||  || — || July 30, 2003 || Socorro || LINEAR || — || align=right | 3.3 km || 
|-id=336 bgcolor=#fefefe
| 206336 ||  || — || July 24, 2003 || Palomar || NEAT || V || align=right data-sort-value="0.90" | 900 m || 
|-id=337 bgcolor=#fefefe
| 206337 ||  || — || July 24, 2003 || Palomar || NEAT || NYS || align=right | 1.1 km || 
|-id=338 bgcolor=#fefefe
| 206338 ||  || — || July 24, 2003 || Palomar || NEAT || V || align=right data-sort-value="0.95" | 950 m || 
|-id=339 bgcolor=#fefefe
| 206339 ||  || — || August 1, 2003 || Haleakala || NEAT || — || align=right | 1.5 km || 
|-id=340 bgcolor=#fefefe
| 206340 ||  || — || August 2, 2003 || Haleakala || NEAT || V || align=right | 1.1 km || 
|-id=341 bgcolor=#fefefe
| 206341 ||  || — || August 2, 2003 || Haleakala || NEAT || NYS || align=right data-sort-value="0.96" | 960 m || 
|-id=342 bgcolor=#FA8072
| 206342 ||  || — || August 1, 2003 || Socorro || LINEAR || — || align=right | 1.0 km || 
|-id=343 bgcolor=#fefefe
| 206343 ||  || — || August 1, 2003 || Haleakala || NEAT || — || align=right | 1.1 km || 
|-id=344 bgcolor=#fefefe
| 206344 ||  || — || August 2, 2003 || Haleakala || NEAT || CLA || align=right | 2.9 km || 
|-id=345 bgcolor=#fefefe
| 206345 ||  || — || August 4, 2003 || Socorro || LINEAR || V || align=right | 1.2 km || 
|-id=346 bgcolor=#fefefe
| 206346 ||  || — || August 4, 2003 || Kitt Peak || Spacewatch || NYS || align=right | 1.7 km || 
|-id=347 bgcolor=#fefefe
| 206347 ||  || — || August 19, 2003 || Campo Imperatore || CINEOS || — || align=right | 1.2 km || 
|-id=348 bgcolor=#E9E9E9
| 206348 ||  || — || August 21, 2003 || Campo Imperatore || CINEOS || — || align=right | 1.2 km || 
|-id=349 bgcolor=#fefefe
| 206349 ||  || — || August 22, 2003 || Haleakala || NEAT || V || align=right | 1.2 km || 
|-id=350 bgcolor=#fefefe
| 206350 ||  || — || August 22, 2003 || Socorro || LINEAR || V || align=right data-sort-value="0.99" | 990 m || 
|-id=351 bgcolor=#fefefe
| 206351 ||  || — || August 22, 2003 || Palomar || NEAT || — || align=right | 1.2 km || 
|-id=352 bgcolor=#fefefe
| 206352 ||  || — || August 22, 2003 || Palomar || NEAT || NYS || align=right | 1.1 km || 
|-id=353 bgcolor=#fefefe
| 206353 ||  || — || August 22, 2003 || Palomar || NEAT || NYS || align=right | 1.7 km || 
|-id=354 bgcolor=#fefefe
| 206354 ||  || — || August 22, 2003 || Socorro || LINEAR || V || align=right | 1.2 km || 
|-id=355 bgcolor=#fefefe
| 206355 ||  || — || August 22, 2003 || Socorro || LINEAR || MAS || align=right | 1.2 km || 
|-id=356 bgcolor=#fefefe
| 206356 ||  || — || August 22, 2003 || Palomar || NEAT || NYS || align=right data-sort-value="0.94" | 940 m || 
|-id=357 bgcolor=#fefefe
| 206357 ||  || — || August 23, 2003 || Palomar || NEAT || V || align=right | 1.1 km || 
|-id=358 bgcolor=#fefefe
| 206358 ||  || — || August 23, 2003 || Palomar || NEAT || NYS || align=right | 1.0 km || 
|-id=359 bgcolor=#FFC2E0
| 206359 ||  || — || August 23, 2003 || Palomar || NEAT || AMO +1km || align=right data-sort-value="0.81" | 810 m || 
|-id=360 bgcolor=#E9E9E9
| 206360 ||  || — || August 22, 2003 || Palomar || NEAT || — || align=right | 1.6 km || 
|-id=361 bgcolor=#fefefe
| 206361 ||  || — || August 23, 2003 || Socorro || LINEAR || — || align=right | 2.6 km || 
|-id=362 bgcolor=#E9E9E9
| 206362 ||  || — || August 23, 2003 || Socorro || LINEAR || INO || align=right | 2.3 km || 
|-id=363 bgcolor=#fefefe
| 206363 ||  || — || August 23, 2003 || Socorro || LINEAR || — || align=right | 1.3 km || 
|-id=364 bgcolor=#E9E9E9
| 206364 ||  || — || August 23, 2003 || Socorro || LINEAR || RAF || align=right | 1.5 km || 
|-id=365 bgcolor=#E9E9E9
| 206365 ||  || — || August 23, 2003 || Socorro || LINEAR || — || align=right | 3.6 km || 
|-id=366 bgcolor=#E9E9E9
| 206366 ||  || — || August 25, 2003 || Palomar || NEAT || JUN || align=right | 1.5 km || 
|-id=367 bgcolor=#E9E9E9
| 206367 ||  || — || August 25, 2003 || Socorro || LINEAR || — || align=right | 1.4 km || 
|-id=368 bgcolor=#E9E9E9
| 206368 ||  || — || August 23, 2003 || Socorro || LINEAR || — || align=right | 1.2 km || 
|-id=369 bgcolor=#E9E9E9
| 206369 ||  || — || August 25, 2003 || Socorro || LINEAR || — || align=right | 1.3 km || 
|-id=370 bgcolor=#fefefe
| 206370 ||  || — || August 25, 2003 || Socorro || LINEAR || FLO || align=right | 1.5 km || 
|-id=371 bgcolor=#fefefe
| 206371 ||  || — || August 25, 2003 || Socorro || LINEAR || V || align=right | 1.1 km || 
|-id=372 bgcolor=#fefefe
| 206372 ||  || — || August 26, 2003 || Črni Vrh || Črni Vrh || NYS || align=right | 1.6 km || 
|-id=373 bgcolor=#fefefe
| 206373 ||  || — || August 30, 2003 || Kitt Peak || Spacewatch || NYS || align=right data-sort-value="0.69" | 690 m || 
|-id=374 bgcolor=#E9E9E9
| 206374 ||  || — || August 31, 2003 || Socorro || LINEAR || — || align=right | 3.0 km || 
|-id=375 bgcolor=#E9E9E9
| 206375 ||  || — || August 31, 2003 || Haleakala || NEAT || ADE || align=right | 4.5 km || 
|-id=376 bgcolor=#E9E9E9
| 206376 ||  || — || August 30, 2003 || Socorro || LINEAR || BRU || align=right | 4.7 km || 
|-id=377 bgcolor=#fefefe
| 206377 ||  || — || August 23, 2003 || Campo Imperatore || CINEOS || — || align=right data-sort-value="0.97" | 970 m || 
|-id=378 bgcolor=#FFC2E0
| 206378 || 2003 RB || — || September 1, 2003 || Socorro || LINEAR || APOPHA || align=right data-sort-value="0.38" | 380 m || 
|-id=379 bgcolor=#E9E9E9
| 206379 ||  || — || September 4, 2003 || Socorro || LINEAR || EUN || align=right | 2.1 km || 
|-id=380 bgcolor=#E9E9E9
| 206380 ||  || — || September 1, 2003 || Socorro || LINEAR || — || align=right | 1.7 km || 
|-id=381 bgcolor=#E9E9E9
| 206381 ||  || — || September 2, 2003 || Socorro || LINEAR || — || align=right | 1.4 km || 
|-id=382 bgcolor=#E9E9E9
| 206382 ||  || — || September 15, 2003 || Palomar || NEAT || — || align=right | 3.5 km || 
|-id=383 bgcolor=#fefefe
| 206383 ||  || — || September 15, 2003 || Palomar || NEAT || — || align=right | 1.4 km || 
|-id=384 bgcolor=#E9E9E9
| 206384 ||  || — || September 15, 2003 || Haleakala || NEAT || — || align=right | 1.7 km || 
|-id=385 bgcolor=#E9E9E9
| 206385 ||  || — || September 15, 2003 || Palomar || NEAT || — || align=right | 1.6 km || 
|-id=386 bgcolor=#fefefe
| 206386 ||  || — || September 13, 2003 || Haleakala || NEAT || — || align=right | 1.3 km || 
|-id=387 bgcolor=#E9E9E9
| 206387 ||  || — || September 14, 2003 || Palomar || NEAT || — || align=right | 2.7 km || 
|-id=388 bgcolor=#E9E9E9
| 206388 ||  || — || September 3, 2003 || Bergisch Gladbach || W. Bickel || — || align=right | 2.0 km || 
|-id=389 bgcolor=#fefefe
| 206389 ||  || — || September 17, 2003 || Kitt Peak || Spacewatch || — || align=right | 1.1 km || 
|-id=390 bgcolor=#fefefe
| 206390 ||  || — || September 16, 2003 || Kitt Peak || Spacewatch || MAS || align=right | 1.1 km || 
|-id=391 bgcolor=#fefefe
| 206391 ||  || — || September 17, 2003 || Kitt Peak || Spacewatch || — || align=right | 1.6 km || 
|-id=392 bgcolor=#E9E9E9
| 206392 ||  || — || September 18, 2003 || Socorro || LINEAR || KRM || align=right | 4.0 km || 
|-id=393 bgcolor=#E9E9E9
| 206393 ||  || — || September 17, 2003 || Kitt Peak || Spacewatch || — || align=right | 1.8 km || 
|-id=394 bgcolor=#E9E9E9
| 206394 ||  || — || September 17, 2003 || Uccle || T. Pauwels || RAF || align=right | 1.4 km || 
|-id=395 bgcolor=#E9E9E9
| 206395 ||  || — || September 18, 2003 || Desert Eagle || W. K. Y. Yeung || — || align=right | 2.2 km || 
|-id=396 bgcolor=#E9E9E9
| 206396 ||  || — || September 16, 2003 || Palomar || NEAT || ADE || align=right | 3.8 km || 
|-id=397 bgcolor=#E9E9E9
| 206397 ||  || — || September 16, 2003 || Anderson Mesa || LONEOS || — || align=right | 1.4 km || 
|-id=398 bgcolor=#E9E9E9
| 206398 ||  || — || September 16, 2003 || Anderson Mesa || LONEOS || — || align=right | 1.8 km || 
|-id=399 bgcolor=#E9E9E9
| 206399 ||  || — || September 18, 2003 || Palomar || NEAT || — || align=right | 3.7 km || 
|-id=400 bgcolor=#E9E9E9
| 206400 ||  || — || September 19, 2003 || Palomar || NEAT || — || align=right | 3.3 km || 
|}

206401–206500 

|-bgcolor=#E9E9E9
| 206401 ||  || — || September 16, 2003 || Anderson Mesa || LONEOS || — || align=right | 1.5 km || 
|-id=402 bgcolor=#fefefe
| 206402 ||  || — || September 17, 2003 || Anderson Mesa || LONEOS || — || align=right | 1.5 km || 
|-id=403 bgcolor=#fefefe
| 206403 ||  || — || September 17, 2003 || Kitt Peak || Spacewatch || V || align=right | 1.1 km || 
|-id=404 bgcolor=#E9E9E9
| 206404 ||  || — || September 17, 2003 || Kitt Peak || Spacewatch || ADE || align=right | 2.3 km || 
|-id=405 bgcolor=#fefefe
| 206405 ||  || — || September 18, 2003 || Kitt Peak || Spacewatch || — || align=right | 3.2 km || 
|-id=406 bgcolor=#E9E9E9
| 206406 ||  || — || September 18, 2003 || Palomar || NEAT || — || align=right | 2.8 km || 
|-id=407 bgcolor=#E9E9E9
| 206407 ||  || — || September 18, 2003 || Palomar || NEAT || EUN || align=right | 1.7 km || 
|-id=408 bgcolor=#E9E9E9
| 206408 ||  || — || September 19, 2003 || Palomar || NEAT || — || align=right | 2.3 km || 
|-id=409 bgcolor=#fefefe
| 206409 ||  || — || September 19, 2003 || Palomar || NEAT || — || align=right | 1.3 km || 
|-id=410 bgcolor=#E9E9E9
| 206410 ||  || — || September 19, 2003 || Kitt Peak || Spacewatch || — || align=right | 1.0 km || 
|-id=411 bgcolor=#E9E9E9
| 206411 ||  || — || September 20, 2003 || Desert Eagle || W. K. Y. Yeung || GEF || align=right | 4.6 km || 
|-id=412 bgcolor=#E9E9E9
| 206412 ||  || — || September 20, 2003 || Palomar || NEAT || — || align=right | 3.0 km || 
|-id=413 bgcolor=#E9E9E9
| 206413 ||  || — || September 20, 2003 || Socorro || LINEAR || — || align=right | 2.2 km || 
|-id=414 bgcolor=#fefefe
| 206414 ||  || — || September 16, 2003 || Anderson Mesa || LONEOS || — || align=right | 2.5 km || 
|-id=415 bgcolor=#E9E9E9
| 206415 ||  || — || September 16, 2003 || Anderson Mesa || LONEOS || — || align=right | 1.3 km || 
|-id=416 bgcolor=#fefefe
| 206416 ||  || — || September 16, 2003 || Kitt Peak || Spacewatch || — || align=right | 1.6 km || 
|-id=417 bgcolor=#fefefe
| 206417 ||  || — || September 19, 2003 || Kitt Peak || Spacewatch || MAS || align=right data-sort-value="0.93" | 930 m || 
|-id=418 bgcolor=#E9E9E9
| 206418 ||  || — || September 20, 2003 || Palomar || NEAT || IAN || align=right | 1.6 km || 
|-id=419 bgcolor=#E9E9E9
| 206419 ||  || — || September 21, 2003 || Campo Imperatore || CINEOS || — || align=right | 1.2 km || 
|-id=420 bgcolor=#E9E9E9
| 206420 ||  || — || September 19, 2003 || Campo Imperatore || CINEOS || — || align=right | 1.6 km || 
|-id=421 bgcolor=#E9E9E9
| 206421 ||  || — || September 20, 2003 || Campo Imperatore || CINEOS || — || align=right | 1.5 km || 
|-id=422 bgcolor=#E9E9E9
| 206422 ||  || — || September 20, 2003 || Haleakala || NEAT || — || align=right | 4.4 km || 
|-id=423 bgcolor=#E9E9E9
| 206423 ||  || — || September 16, 2003 || Socorro || LINEAR || MAR || align=right | 1.8 km || 
|-id=424 bgcolor=#fefefe
| 206424 ||  || — || September 17, 2003 || Socorro || LINEAR || V || align=right data-sort-value="0.99" | 990 m || 
|-id=425 bgcolor=#E9E9E9
| 206425 ||  || — || September 20, 2003 || Socorro || LINEAR || — || align=right | 1.6 km || 
|-id=426 bgcolor=#E9E9E9
| 206426 ||  || — || September 21, 2003 || Socorro || LINEAR || — || align=right | 4.2 km || 
|-id=427 bgcolor=#E9E9E9
| 206427 ||  || — || September 23, 2003 || Haleakala || NEAT || ADE || align=right | 3.6 km || 
|-id=428 bgcolor=#E9E9E9
| 206428 ||  || — || September 21, 2003 || Uccle || T. Pauwels || — || align=right | 1.1 km || 
|-id=429 bgcolor=#E9E9E9
| 206429 ||  || — || September 18, 2003 || Kitt Peak || Spacewatch || — || align=right | 2.1 km || 
|-id=430 bgcolor=#fefefe
| 206430 ||  || — || September 19, 2003 || Palomar || NEAT || LCI || align=right | 2.1 km || 
|-id=431 bgcolor=#fefefe
| 206431 ||  || — || September 20, 2003 || Socorro || LINEAR || — || align=right | 1.3 km || 
|-id=432 bgcolor=#E9E9E9
| 206432 ||  || — || September 20, 2003 || Socorro || LINEAR || — || align=right | 1.9 km || 
|-id=433 bgcolor=#E9E9E9
| 206433 ||  || — || September 22, 2003 || Anderson Mesa || LONEOS || — || align=right | 1.9 km || 
|-id=434 bgcolor=#E9E9E9
| 206434 ||  || — || September 20, 2003 || Palomar || NEAT || — || align=right | 2.4 km || 
|-id=435 bgcolor=#E9E9E9
| 206435 ||  || — || September 20, 2003 || Palomar || NEAT || — || align=right | 1.7 km || 
|-id=436 bgcolor=#E9E9E9
| 206436 ||  || — || September 21, 2003 || Anderson Mesa || LONEOS || — || align=right | 3.7 km || 
|-id=437 bgcolor=#E9E9E9
| 206437 ||  || — || September 21, 2003 || Anderson Mesa || LONEOS || ADE || align=right | 2.9 km || 
|-id=438 bgcolor=#E9E9E9
| 206438 ||  || — || September 22, 2003 || Socorro || LINEAR || — || align=right | 3.6 km || 
|-id=439 bgcolor=#E9E9E9
| 206439 ||  || — || September 26, 2003 || Socorro || LINEAR || — || align=right data-sort-value="0.99" | 990 m || 
|-id=440 bgcolor=#E9E9E9
| 206440 ||  || — || September 25, 2003 || Uccle || Uccle Obs. || ADE || align=right | 4.1 km || 
|-id=441 bgcolor=#E9E9E9
| 206441 ||  || — || September 29, 2003 || Desert Eagle || W. K. Y. Yeung || — || align=right | 3.4 km || 
|-id=442 bgcolor=#d6d6d6
| 206442 ||  || — || September 25, 2003 || Palomar || NEAT || — || align=right | 5.1 km || 
|-id=443 bgcolor=#E9E9E9
| 206443 ||  || — || September 26, 2003 || Socorro || LINEAR || — || align=right | 2.2 km || 
|-id=444 bgcolor=#E9E9E9
| 206444 ||  || — || September 27, 2003 || Socorro || LINEAR || — || align=right | 1.1 km || 
|-id=445 bgcolor=#E9E9E9
| 206445 ||  || — || September 26, 2003 || Socorro || LINEAR || MAR || align=right | 1.6 km || 
|-id=446 bgcolor=#fefefe
| 206446 ||  || — || September 27, 2003 || Kitt Peak || Spacewatch || V || align=right data-sort-value="0.72" | 720 m || 
|-id=447 bgcolor=#E9E9E9
| 206447 ||  || — || September 29, 2003 || Kitt Peak || Spacewatch || — || align=right | 2.7 km || 
|-id=448 bgcolor=#E9E9E9
| 206448 ||  || — || September 26, 2003 || Goodricke-Pigott || R. A. Tucker || — || align=right | 3.1 km || 
|-id=449 bgcolor=#E9E9E9
| 206449 ||  || — || September 28, 2003 || Socorro || LINEAR || — || align=right | 1.7 km || 
|-id=450 bgcolor=#E9E9E9
| 206450 ||  || — || September 30, 2003 || Kitt Peak || Spacewatch || — || align=right | 1.2 km || 
|-id=451 bgcolor=#fefefe
| 206451 ||  || — || September 17, 2003 || Palomar || NEAT || MAS || align=right data-sort-value="0.96" | 960 m || 
|-id=452 bgcolor=#E9E9E9
| 206452 ||  || — || September 30, 2003 || Anderson Mesa || LONEOS || — || align=right | 5.5 km || 
|-id=453 bgcolor=#E9E9E9
| 206453 ||  || — || September 21, 2003 || Anderson Mesa || LONEOS || MAR || align=right | 1.9 km || 
|-id=454 bgcolor=#fefefe
| 206454 ||  || — || September 17, 2003 || Kitt Peak || Spacewatch || NYS || align=right data-sort-value="0.81" | 810 m || 
|-id=455 bgcolor=#E9E9E9
| 206455 ||  || — || September 21, 2003 || Haleakala || NEAT || — || align=right | 4.2 km || 
|-id=456 bgcolor=#E9E9E9
| 206456 ||  || — || September 20, 2003 || Palomar || NEAT || — || align=right | 1.8 km || 
|-id=457 bgcolor=#fefefe
| 206457 ||  || — || September 18, 2003 || Kitt Peak || Spacewatch || NYS || align=right data-sort-value="0.94" | 940 m || 
|-id=458 bgcolor=#E9E9E9
| 206458 || 2003 TM || — || October 3, 2003 || Cordell-Lorenz || D. T. Durig || — || align=right | 2.2 km || 
|-id=459 bgcolor=#E9E9E9
| 206459 ||  || — || October 2, 2003 || Socorro || LINEAR || — || align=right | 4.5 km || 
|-id=460 bgcolor=#E9E9E9
| 206460 ||  || — || October 1, 2003 || Anderson Mesa || LONEOS || JUN || align=right | 1.7 km || 
|-id=461 bgcolor=#E9E9E9
| 206461 ||  || — || October 1, 2003 || Anderson Mesa || LONEOS || ADE || align=right | 3.6 km || 
|-id=462 bgcolor=#fefefe
| 206462 ||  || — || October 15, 2003 || Wrightwood || J. W. Young || V || align=right | 1.2 km || 
|-id=463 bgcolor=#E9E9E9
| 206463 ||  || — || October 14, 2003 || Anderson Mesa || LONEOS || — || align=right | 1.3 km || 
|-id=464 bgcolor=#E9E9E9
| 206464 ||  || — || October 15, 2003 || Anderson Mesa || LONEOS || — || align=right | 3.8 km || 
|-id=465 bgcolor=#E9E9E9
| 206465 ||  || — || October 14, 2003 || Palomar || NEAT || ADE || align=right | 4.0 km || 
|-id=466 bgcolor=#E9E9E9
| 206466 ||  || — || October 2, 2003 || Kitt Peak || Spacewatch || — || align=right | 1.5 km || 
|-id=467 bgcolor=#E9E9E9
| 206467 ||  || — || October 2, 2003 || Socorro || LINEAR || — || align=right | 1.9 km || 
|-id=468 bgcolor=#fefefe
| 206468 || 2003 UY || — || October 16, 2003 || Kitt Peak || Spacewatch || — || align=right | 1.3 km || 
|-id=469 bgcolor=#E9E9E9
| 206469 ||  || — || October 16, 2003 || Kitt Peak || Spacewatch || — || align=right | 1.1 km || 
|-id=470 bgcolor=#fefefe
| 206470 ||  || — || October 16, 2003 || Kitt Peak || Spacewatch || NYS || align=right data-sort-value="0.83" | 830 m || 
|-id=471 bgcolor=#E9E9E9
| 206471 ||  || — || October 16, 2003 || Socorro || LINEAR || HNS || align=right | 1.7 km || 
|-id=472 bgcolor=#E9E9E9
| 206472 ||  || — || October 17, 2003 || Kitt Peak || Spacewatch || — || align=right | 4.1 km || 
|-id=473 bgcolor=#fefefe
| 206473 ||  || — || October 19, 2003 || Kitt Peak || Spacewatch || V || align=right | 1.2 km || 
|-id=474 bgcolor=#E9E9E9
| 206474 ||  || — || October 18, 2003 || Anderson Mesa || LONEOS || — || align=right | 3.7 km || 
|-id=475 bgcolor=#E9E9E9
| 206475 ||  || — || October 16, 2003 || Anderson Mesa || LONEOS || — || align=right | 1.9 km || 
|-id=476 bgcolor=#E9E9E9
| 206476 ||  || — || October 16, 2003 || Palomar || NEAT || — || align=right | 4.1 km || 
|-id=477 bgcolor=#d6d6d6
| 206477 ||  || — || October 18, 2003 || Palomar || NEAT || CHA || align=right | 2.6 km || 
|-id=478 bgcolor=#E9E9E9
| 206478 ||  || — || October 18, 2003 || Palomar || NEAT || — || align=right | 4.2 km || 
|-id=479 bgcolor=#E9E9E9
| 206479 ||  || — || October 18, 2003 || Palomar || NEAT || — || align=right | 1.5 km || 
|-id=480 bgcolor=#E9E9E9
| 206480 ||  || — || October 18, 2003 || Palomar || NEAT || BRG || align=right | 2.7 km || 
|-id=481 bgcolor=#E9E9E9
| 206481 ||  || — || October 16, 2003 || Kitt Peak || Spacewatch || — || align=right | 2.7 km || 
|-id=482 bgcolor=#E9E9E9
| 206482 ||  || — || October 16, 2003 || Anderson Mesa || LONEOS || — || align=right | 2.6 km || 
|-id=483 bgcolor=#E9E9E9
| 206483 ||  || — || October 16, 2003 || Palomar || NEAT || — || align=right | 2.5 km || 
|-id=484 bgcolor=#E9E9E9
| 206484 ||  || — || October 16, 2003 || Palomar || NEAT || — || align=right | 2.6 km || 
|-id=485 bgcolor=#E9E9E9
| 206485 ||  || — || October 16, 2003 || Palomar || NEAT || — || align=right | 3.4 km || 
|-id=486 bgcolor=#E9E9E9
| 206486 ||  || — || October 16, 2003 || Palomar || NEAT || ADE || align=right | 3.2 km || 
|-id=487 bgcolor=#E9E9E9
| 206487 ||  || — || October 16, 2003 || Kitt Peak || Spacewatch || — || align=right | 1.1 km || 
|-id=488 bgcolor=#E9E9E9
| 206488 ||  || — || October 16, 2003 || Haleakala || NEAT || — || align=right | 2.4 km || 
|-id=489 bgcolor=#fefefe
| 206489 ||  || — || October 17, 2003 || Kitt Peak || Spacewatch || — || align=right | 1.4 km || 
|-id=490 bgcolor=#E9E9E9
| 206490 ||  || — || October 17, 2003 || Anderson Mesa || LONEOS || — || align=right | 2.0 km || 
|-id=491 bgcolor=#E9E9E9
| 206491 ||  || — || October 16, 2003 || Goodricke-Pigott || R. A. Tucker || — || align=right | 1.7 km || 
|-id=492 bgcolor=#E9E9E9
| 206492 ||  || — || October 16, 2003 || Anderson Mesa || LONEOS || — || align=right | 2.9 km || 
|-id=493 bgcolor=#E9E9E9
| 206493 ||  || — || October 16, 2003 || Anderson Mesa || LONEOS || — || align=right | 2.2 km || 
|-id=494 bgcolor=#E9E9E9
| 206494 ||  || — || October 18, 2003 || Kitt Peak || Spacewatch || — || align=right | 1.2 km || 
|-id=495 bgcolor=#E9E9E9
| 206495 ||  || — || October 18, 2003 || Kitt Peak || Spacewatch || — || align=right | 1.6 km || 
|-id=496 bgcolor=#E9E9E9
| 206496 ||  || — || October 18, 2003 || Kitt Peak || Spacewatch || — || align=right | 2.2 km || 
|-id=497 bgcolor=#E9E9E9
| 206497 ||  || — || October 19, 2003 || Haleakala || NEAT || — || align=right | 1.6 km || 
|-id=498 bgcolor=#E9E9E9
| 206498 ||  || — || October 19, 2003 || Haleakala || NEAT || — || align=right | 4.6 km || 
|-id=499 bgcolor=#E9E9E9
| 206499 ||  || — || October 20, 2003 || Kitt Peak || Spacewatch || — || align=right | 1.6 km || 
|-id=500 bgcolor=#E9E9E9
| 206500 ||  || — || October 20, 2003 || Kitt Peak || Spacewatch || — || align=right | 1.4 km || 
|}

206501–206600 

|-bgcolor=#E9E9E9
| 206501 ||  || — || October 19, 2003 || Kitt Peak || Spacewatch || HEN || align=right | 1.5 km || 
|-id=502 bgcolor=#E9E9E9
| 206502 ||  || — || October 20, 2003 || Socorro || LINEAR || — || align=right | 1.4 km || 
|-id=503 bgcolor=#E9E9E9
| 206503 ||  || — || October 20, 2003 || Kitt Peak || Spacewatch || EUN || align=right | 1.7 km || 
|-id=504 bgcolor=#E9E9E9
| 206504 ||  || — || October 21, 2003 || Socorro || LINEAR || — || align=right | 2.2 km || 
|-id=505 bgcolor=#E9E9E9
| 206505 ||  || — || October 21, 2003 || Socorro || LINEAR || — || align=right | 1.6 km || 
|-id=506 bgcolor=#E9E9E9
| 206506 ||  || — || October 17, 2003 || Kitt Peak || Spacewatch || — || align=right | 3.0 km || 
|-id=507 bgcolor=#E9E9E9
| 206507 ||  || — || October 18, 2003 || Socorro || LINEAR || JUN || align=right | 1.6 km || 
|-id=508 bgcolor=#E9E9E9
| 206508 ||  || — || October 19, 2003 || Socorro || LINEAR || — || align=right | 2.4 km || 
|-id=509 bgcolor=#E9E9E9
| 206509 ||  || — || October 20, 2003 || Socorro || LINEAR || BRU || align=right | 4.1 km || 
|-id=510 bgcolor=#E9E9E9
| 206510 ||  || — || October 20, 2003 || Palomar || NEAT || — || align=right | 2.9 km || 
|-id=511 bgcolor=#E9E9E9
| 206511 ||  || — || October 20, 2003 || Kitt Peak || Spacewatch || — || align=right | 1.8 km || 
|-id=512 bgcolor=#E9E9E9
| 206512 ||  || — || October 21, 2003 || Kitt Peak || Spacewatch || — || align=right | 2.6 km || 
|-id=513 bgcolor=#fefefe
| 206513 ||  || — || October 18, 2003 || Palomar || NEAT || V || align=right | 1.1 km || 
|-id=514 bgcolor=#E9E9E9
| 206514 ||  || — || October 19, 2003 || Palomar || NEAT || — || align=right | 1.9 km || 
|-id=515 bgcolor=#E9E9E9
| 206515 ||  || — || October 19, 2003 || Palomar || NEAT || GEF || align=right | 2.1 km || 
|-id=516 bgcolor=#E9E9E9
| 206516 ||  || — || October 20, 2003 || Palomar || NEAT || — || align=right | 1.9 km || 
|-id=517 bgcolor=#E9E9E9
| 206517 ||  || — || October 20, 2003 || Palomar || NEAT || — || align=right | 1.9 km || 
|-id=518 bgcolor=#E9E9E9
| 206518 ||  || — || October 21, 2003 || Socorro || LINEAR || — || align=right | 1.7 km || 
|-id=519 bgcolor=#E9E9E9
| 206519 ||  || — || October 21, 2003 || Socorro || LINEAR || — || align=right | 2.6 km || 
|-id=520 bgcolor=#E9E9E9
| 206520 ||  || — || October 18, 2003 || Anderson Mesa || LONEOS || — || align=right | 3.3 km || 
|-id=521 bgcolor=#E9E9E9
| 206521 ||  || — || October 18, 2003 || Anderson Mesa || LONEOS || — || align=right | 2.3 km || 
|-id=522 bgcolor=#E9E9E9
| 206522 ||  || — || October 18, 2003 || Anderson Mesa || LONEOS || CLO || align=right | 3.4 km || 
|-id=523 bgcolor=#E9E9E9
| 206523 ||  || — || October 18, 2003 || Anderson Mesa || LONEOS || — || align=right | 3.6 km || 
|-id=524 bgcolor=#E9E9E9
| 206524 ||  || — || October 20, 2003 || Socorro || LINEAR || — || align=right | 3.1 km || 
|-id=525 bgcolor=#fefefe
| 206525 ||  || — || October 20, 2003 || Kitt Peak || Spacewatch || V || align=right | 1.2 km || 
|-id=526 bgcolor=#E9E9E9
| 206526 ||  || — || October 20, 2003 || Kitt Peak || Spacewatch || — || align=right | 2.4 km || 
|-id=527 bgcolor=#E9E9E9
| 206527 ||  || — || October 21, 2003 || Socorro || LINEAR || — || align=right | 1.4 km || 
|-id=528 bgcolor=#E9E9E9
| 206528 ||  || — || October 21, 2003 || Socorro || LINEAR || MIS || align=right | 3.3 km || 
|-id=529 bgcolor=#E9E9E9
| 206529 ||  || — || October 22, 2003 || Socorro || LINEAR || — || align=right | 3.0 km || 
|-id=530 bgcolor=#E9E9E9
| 206530 ||  || — || October 22, 2003 || Socorro || LINEAR || — || align=right | 1.7 km || 
|-id=531 bgcolor=#E9E9E9
| 206531 ||  || — || October 20, 2003 || Kitt Peak || Spacewatch || — || align=right | 2.7 km || 
|-id=532 bgcolor=#E9E9E9
| 206532 ||  || — || October 21, 2003 || Kitt Peak || Spacewatch || — || align=right | 1.6 km || 
|-id=533 bgcolor=#E9E9E9
| 206533 ||  || — || October 21, 2003 || Palomar || NEAT || — || align=right | 2.2 km || 
|-id=534 bgcolor=#E9E9E9
| 206534 ||  || — || October 21, 2003 || Anderson Mesa || LONEOS || — || align=right | 1.7 km || 
|-id=535 bgcolor=#E9E9E9
| 206535 ||  || — || October 21, 2003 || Palomar || NEAT || — || align=right | 2.8 km || 
|-id=536 bgcolor=#E9E9E9
| 206536 ||  || — || October 22, 2003 || Socorro || LINEAR || — || align=right | 3.8 km || 
|-id=537 bgcolor=#E9E9E9
| 206537 ||  || — || October 22, 2003 || Socorro || LINEAR || — || align=right | 3.0 km || 
|-id=538 bgcolor=#E9E9E9
| 206538 ||  || — || October 20, 2003 || Socorro || LINEAR || — || align=right | 2.3 km || 
|-id=539 bgcolor=#E9E9E9
| 206539 ||  || — || October 20, 2003 || Kitt Peak || Spacewatch || — || align=right | 2.4 km || 
|-id=540 bgcolor=#E9E9E9
| 206540 ||  || — || October 21, 2003 || Kitt Peak || Spacewatch || — || align=right | 1.6 km || 
|-id=541 bgcolor=#E9E9E9
| 206541 ||  || — || October 21, 2003 || Kitt Peak || Spacewatch || HEN || align=right | 1.4 km || 
|-id=542 bgcolor=#E9E9E9
| 206542 ||  || — || October 21, 2003 || Anderson Mesa || LONEOS || — || align=right | 2.8 km || 
|-id=543 bgcolor=#E9E9E9
| 206543 ||  || — || October 21, 2003 || Kitt Peak || Spacewatch || — || align=right | 2.1 km || 
|-id=544 bgcolor=#E9E9E9
| 206544 ||  || — || October 21, 2003 || Socorro || LINEAR || — || align=right | 1.2 km || 
|-id=545 bgcolor=#E9E9E9
| 206545 ||  || — || October 21, 2003 || Kitt Peak || Spacewatch || — || align=right | 1.7 km || 
|-id=546 bgcolor=#E9E9E9
| 206546 ||  || — || October 22, 2003 || Socorro || LINEAR || — || align=right | 3.1 km || 
|-id=547 bgcolor=#d6d6d6
| 206547 ||  || — || October 21, 2003 || Socorro || LINEAR || NAE || align=right | 4.7 km || 
|-id=548 bgcolor=#E9E9E9
| 206548 ||  || — || October 21, 2003 || Socorro || LINEAR || — || align=right | 2.8 km || 
|-id=549 bgcolor=#E9E9E9
| 206549 ||  || — || October 21, 2003 || Palomar || NEAT || — || align=right | 1.9 km || 
|-id=550 bgcolor=#E9E9E9
| 206550 ||  || — || October 22, 2003 || Socorro || LINEAR || — || align=right | 4.1 km || 
|-id=551 bgcolor=#E9E9E9
| 206551 ||  || — || October 24, 2003 || Socorro || LINEAR || — || align=right | 2.2 km || 
|-id=552 bgcolor=#E9E9E9
| 206552 ||  || — || October 22, 2003 || Kitt Peak || Spacewatch || — || align=right | 1.3 km || 
|-id=553 bgcolor=#E9E9E9
| 206553 ||  || — || October 23, 2003 || Kitt Peak || Spacewatch || ADE || align=right | 2.7 km || 
|-id=554 bgcolor=#E9E9E9
| 206554 ||  || — || October 24, 2003 || Socorro || LINEAR || HEN || align=right | 1.6 km || 
|-id=555 bgcolor=#E9E9E9
| 206555 ||  || — || October 25, 2003 || Socorro || LINEAR || — || align=right | 3.3 km || 
|-id=556 bgcolor=#E9E9E9
| 206556 ||  || — || October 25, 2003 || Socorro || LINEAR || — || align=right | 2.7 km || 
|-id=557 bgcolor=#E9E9E9
| 206557 ||  || — || October 25, 2003 || Socorro || LINEAR || — || align=right | 4.3 km || 
|-id=558 bgcolor=#E9E9E9
| 206558 ||  || — || October 24, 2003 || Kitt Peak || Spacewatch || — || align=right | 1.5 km || 
|-id=559 bgcolor=#E9E9E9
| 206559 ||  || — || October 25, 2003 || Socorro || LINEAR || MIS || align=right | 3.9 km || 
|-id=560 bgcolor=#E9E9E9
| 206560 ||  || — || October 25, 2003 || Kitt Peak || Spacewatch || — || align=right | 1.1 km || 
|-id=561 bgcolor=#E9E9E9
| 206561 ||  || — || October 25, 2003 || Kitt Peak || Spacewatch || — || align=right | 2.0 km || 
|-id=562 bgcolor=#E9E9E9
| 206562 ||  || — || October 26, 2003 || Kitt Peak || Spacewatch || — || align=right | 1.6 km || 
|-id=563 bgcolor=#E9E9E9
| 206563 ||  || — || October 27, 2003 || Kitt Peak || Spacewatch || — || align=right | 3.0 km || 
|-id=564 bgcolor=#E9E9E9
| 206564 ||  || — || October 28, 2003 || Socorro || LINEAR || — || align=right | 2.1 km || 
|-id=565 bgcolor=#E9E9E9
| 206565 ||  || — || October 16, 2003 || Anderson Mesa || LONEOS || — || align=right | 1.6 km || 
|-id=566 bgcolor=#E9E9E9
| 206566 ||  || — || October 30, 2003 || Socorro || LINEAR || — || align=right | 1.8 km || 
|-id=567 bgcolor=#E9E9E9
| 206567 ||  || — || October 29, 2003 || Kitt Peak || Spacewatch || — || align=right | 2.1 km || 
|-id=568 bgcolor=#E9E9E9
| 206568 ||  || — || October 27, 2003 || Socorro || LINEAR || — || align=right | 4.0 km || 
|-id=569 bgcolor=#E9E9E9
| 206569 ||  || — || October 28, 2003 || Socorro || LINEAR || — || align=right | 3.5 km || 
|-id=570 bgcolor=#fefefe
| 206570 ||  || — || October 16, 2003 || Kitt Peak || Spacewatch || — || align=right | 2.7 km || 
|-id=571 bgcolor=#E9E9E9
| 206571 ||  || — || October 18, 2003 || Anderson Mesa || LONEOS || ADE || align=right | 2.6 km || 
|-id=572 bgcolor=#d6d6d6
| 206572 ||  || — || October 19, 2003 || Kitt Peak || Spacewatch || KOR || align=right | 1.4 km || 
|-id=573 bgcolor=#E9E9E9
| 206573 ||  || — || October 17, 2003 || Kitt Peak || Spacewatch || — || align=right | 3.7 km || 
|-id=574 bgcolor=#E9E9E9
| 206574 || 2003 VC || — || November 3, 2003 || Piszkéstető || K. Sárneczky || — || align=right | 2.9 km || 
|-id=575 bgcolor=#E9E9E9
| 206575 ||  || — || November 15, 2003 || Kitt Peak || Spacewatch || MRX || align=right | 1.9 km || 
|-id=576 bgcolor=#E9E9E9
| 206576 ||  || — || November 14, 2003 || Palomar || NEAT || EUN || align=right | 2.5 km || 
|-id=577 bgcolor=#E9E9E9
| 206577 ||  || — || November 15, 2003 || Kitt Peak || Spacewatch || HEN || align=right | 1.4 km || 
|-id=578 bgcolor=#E9E9E9
| 206578 || 2003 WQ || — || November 16, 2003 || Catalina || CSS || — || align=right | 2.0 km || 
|-id=579 bgcolor=#E9E9E9
| 206579 ||  || — || November 16, 2003 || Desert Moon || B. L. Stevens || HOF || align=right | 3.8 km || 
|-id=580 bgcolor=#E9E9E9
| 206580 ||  || — || November 16, 2003 || Catalina || CSS || GEF || align=right | 2.0 km || 
|-id=581 bgcolor=#E9E9E9
| 206581 ||  || — || November 18, 2003 || Kitt Peak || Spacewatch || MAR || align=right | 1.9 km || 
|-id=582 bgcolor=#E9E9E9
| 206582 ||  || — || November 19, 2003 || Socorro || LINEAR || — || align=right | 2.7 km || 
|-id=583 bgcolor=#E9E9E9
| 206583 ||  || — || November 18, 2003 || Kitt Peak || Spacewatch || GEF || align=right | 2.2 km || 
|-id=584 bgcolor=#E9E9E9
| 206584 ||  || — || November 16, 2003 || Kitt Peak || Spacewatch || MRX || align=right | 1.4 km || 
|-id=585 bgcolor=#E9E9E9
| 206585 ||  || — || November 16, 2003 || Kitt Peak || Spacewatch || — || align=right | 2.3 km || 
|-id=586 bgcolor=#E9E9E9
| 206586 ||  || — || November 18, 2003 || Palomar || NEAT || — || align=right | 2.4 km || 
|-id=587 bgcolor=#E9E9E9
| 206587 ||  || — || November 19, 2003 || Socorro || LINEAR || — || align=right | 3.8 km || 
|-id=588 bgcolor=#E9E9E9
| 206588 ||  || — || November 20, 2003 || Socorro || LINEAR || — || align=right | 2.9 km || 
|-id=589 bgcolor=#E9E9E9
| 206589 ||  || — || November 16, 2003 || Kitt Peak || Spacewatch || — || align=right | 1.4 km || 
|-id=590 bgcolor=#E9E9E9
| 206590 ||  || — || November 18, 2003 || Kitt Peak || Spacewatch || WIT || align=right | 1.2 km || 
|-id=591 bgcolor=#E9E9E9
| 206591 ||  || — || November 18, 2003 || Palomar || NEAT || — || align=right | 1.7 km || 
|-id=592 bgcolor=#E9E9E9
| 206592 ||  || — || November 18, 2003 || Palomar || NEAT || — || align=right | 2.5 km || 
|-id=593 bgcolor=#E9E9E9
| 206593 ||  || — || November 19, 2003 || Kitt Peak || Spacewatch || XIZ || align=right | 1.5 km || 
|-id=594 bgcolor=#E9E9E9
| 206594 ||  || — || November 19, 2003 || Socorro || LINEAR || — || align=right | 3.0 km || 
|-id=595 bgcolor=#E9E9E9
| 206595 ||  || — || November 19, 2003 || Kitt Peak || Spacewatch || — || align=right | 3.2 km || 
|-id=596 bgcolor=#E9E9E9
| 206596 ||  || — || November 19, 2003 || Kitt Peak || Spacewatch || — || align=right | 1.8 km || 
|-id=597 bgcolor=#E9E9E9
| 206597 ||  || — || November 19, 2003 || Palomar || NEAT || — || align=right | 2.4 km || 
|-id=598 bgcolor=#E9E9E9
| 206598 ||  || — || November 19, 2003 || Palomar || NEAT || WIT || align=right | 1.7 km || 
|-id=599 bgcolor=#E9E9E9
| 206599 ||  || — || November 19, 2003 || Kitt Peak || Spacewatch || — || align=right | 1.3 km || 
|-id=600 bgcolor=#E9E9E9
| 206600 ||  || — || November 20, 2003 || Kitt Peak || Spacewatch || — || align=right | 2.2 km || 
|}

206601–206700 

|-bgcolor=#E9E9E9
| 206601 ||  || — || November 20, 2003 || Kitt Peak || Spacewatch || PAD || align=right | 3.3 km || 
|-id=602 bgcolor=#E9E9E9
| 206602 ||  || — || November 20, 2003 || Socorro || LINEAR || — || align=right | 4.6 km || 
|-id=603 bgcolor=#E9E9E9
| 206603 ||  || — || November 20, 2003 || Socorro || LINEAR || — || align=right | 2.4 km || 
|-id=604 bgcolor=#E9E9E9
| 206604 ||  || — || November 19, 2003 || Kitt Peak || Spacewatch || — || align=right | 1.1 km || 
|-id=605 bgcolor=#E9E9E9
| 206605 ||  || — || November 19, 2003 || Kitt Peak || Spacewatch || — || align=right | 3.0 km || 
|-id=606 bgcolor=#E9E9E9
| 206606 ||  || — || November 19, 2003 || Kitt Peak || Spacewatch || — || align=right | 2.0 km || 
|-id=607 bgcolor=#d6d6d6
| 206607 ||  || — || November 19, 2003 || Kitt Peak || Spacewatch || BRA || align=right | 2.5 km || 
|-id=608 bgcolor=#fefefe
| 206608 ||  || — || November 19, 2003 || Socorro || LINEAR || — || align=right | 1.5 km || 
|-id=609 bgcolor=#E9E9E9
| 206609 ||  || — || November 19, 2003 || Palomar || NEAT || — || align=right | 5.1 km || 
|-id=610 bgcolor=#E9E9E9
| 206610 ||  || — || November 20, 2003 || Socorro || LINEAR || — || align=right | 1.5 km || 
|-id=611 bgcolor=#d6d6d6
| 206611 ||  || — || November 20, 2003 || Socorro || LINEAR || — || align=right | 4.1 km || 
|-id=612 bgcolor=#E9E9E9
| 206612 ||  || — || November 19, 2003 || Anderson Mesa || LONEOS || — || align=right | 1.9 km || 
|-id=613 bgcolor=#d6d6d6
| 206613 ||  || — || November 20, 2003 || Palomar || NEAT || — || align=right | 3.3 km || 
|-id=614 bgcolor=#E9E9E9
| 206614 ||  || — || November 21, 2003 || Socorro || LINEAR || — || align=right | 3.8 km || 
|-id=615 bgcolor=#E9E9E9
| 206615 ||  || — || November 24, 2003 || Kitt Peak || Spacewatch || — || align=right | 2.9 km || 
|-id=616 bgcolor=#E9E9E9
| 206616 ||  || — || November 20, 2003 || Socorro || LINEAR || AEO || align=right | 1.9 km || 
|-id=617 bgcolor=#d6d6d6
| 206617 ||  || — || November 20, 2003 || Socorro || LINEAR || — || align=right | 4.0 km || 
|-id=618 bgcolor=#E9E9E9
| 206618 ||  || — || November 20, 2003 || Socorro || LINEAR || — || align=right | 3.2 km || 
|-id=619 bgcolor=#E9E9E9
| 206619 ||  || — || November 20, 2003 || Socorro || LINEAR || — || align=right | 2.6 km || 
|-id=620 bgcolor=#E9E9E9
| 206620 ||  || — || November 20, 2003 || Socorro || LINEAR || — || align=right | 2.8 km || 
|-id=621 bgcolor=#E9E9E9
| 206621 ||  || — || November 20, 2003 || Socorro || LINEAR || — || align=right | 3.9 km || 
|-id=622 bgcolor=#E9E9E9
| 206622 ||  || — || November 21, 2003 || Socorro || LINEAR || — || align=right | 3.8 km || 
|-id=623 bgcolor=#E9E9E9
| 206623 ||  || — || November 21, 2003 || Socorro || LINEAR || — || align=right | 5.8 km || 
|-id=624 bgcolor=#E9E9E9
| 206624 ||  || — || November 21, 2003 || Palomar || NEAT || — || align=right | 3.8 km || 
|-id=625 bgcolor=#E9E9E9
| 206625 ||  || — || November 23, 2003 || Socorro || LINEAR || — || align=right | 2.6 km || 
|-id=626 bgcolor=#E9E9E9
| 206626 ||  || — || November 21, 2003 || Socorro || LINEAR || — || align=right | 3.1 km || 
|-id=627 bgcolor=#E9E9E9
| 206627 ||  || — || November 23, 2003 || Palomar || NEAT || — || align=right | 3.1 km || 
|-id=628 bgcolor=#d6d6d6
| 206628 ||  || — || November 24, 2003 || Palomar || NEAT || EUP || align=right | 7.9 km || 
|-id=629 bgcolor=#E9E9E9
| 206629 ||  || — || November 26, 2003 || Socorro || LINEAR || — || align=right | 2.5 km || 
|-id=630 bgcolor=#E9E9E9
| 206630 ||  || — || November 29, 2003 || Socorro || LINEAR || — || align=right | 3.6 km || 
|-id=631 bgcolor=#E9E9E9
| 206631 ||  || — || November 30, 2003 || Socorro || LINEAR || — || align=right | 3.8 km || 
|-id=632 bgcolor=#E9E9E9
| 206632 ||  || — || November 18, 2003 || Kitt Peak || Spacewatch || — || align=right | 2.2 km || 
|-id=633 bgcolor=#d6d6d6
| 206633 ||  || — || November 20, 2003 || Socorro || LINEAR || — || align=right | 6.6 km || 
|-id=634 bgcolor=#E9E9E9
| 206634 ||  || — || November 21, 2003 || Palomar || NEAT || — || align=right | 4.8 km || 
|-id=635 bgcolor=#E9E9E9
| 206635 ||  || — || November 29, 2003 || Socorro || LINEAR || — || align=right | 3.4 km || 
|-id=636 bgcolor=#E9E9E9
| 206636 ||  || — || November 29, 2003 || Socorro || LINEAR || — || align=right | 3.0 km || 
|-id=637 bgcolor=#E9E9E9
| 206637 ||  || — || November 30, 2003 || Kitt Peak || Spacewatch || — || align=right | 1.8 km || 
|-id=638 bgcolor=#E9E9E9
| 206638 ||  || — || November 24, 2003 || Socorro || LINEAR || — || align=right | 4.5 km || 
|-id=639 bgcolor=#E9E9E9
| 206639 ||  || — || November 24, 2003 || Palomar || NEAT || GAL || align=right | 2.4 km || 
|-id=640 bgcolor=#E9E9E9
| 206640 ||  || — || December 3, 2003 || Anderson Mesa || LONEOS || — || align=right | 6.4 km || 
|-id=641 bgcolor=#d6d6d6
| 206641 ||  || — || December 4, 2003 || Socorro || LINEAR || — || align=right | 8.3 km || 
|-id=642 bgcolor=#E9E9E9
| 206642 ||  || — || December 14, 2003 || Palomar || NEAT || — || align=right | 1.4 km || 
|-id=643 bgcolor=#E9E9E9
| 206643 ||  || — || December 14, 2003 || Palomar || NEAT || — || align=right | 4.2 km || 
|-id=644 bgcolor=#E9E9E9
| 206644 ||  || — || December 14, 2003 || Kitt Peak || Spacewatch || — || align=right | 3.5 km || 
|-id=645 bgcolor=#E9E9E9
| 206645 ||  || — || December 3, 2003 || Socorro || LINEAR || MAR || align=right | 1.7 km || 
|-id=646 bgcolor=#E9E9E9
| 206646 ||  || — || December 19, 2003 || Kingsnake || J. V. McClusky || — || align=right | 5.2 km || 
|-id=647 bgcolor=#E9E9E9
| 206647 ||  || — || December 17, 2003 || Socorro || LINEAR || — || align=right | 1.9 km || 
|-id=648 bgcolor=#d6d6d6
| 206648 ||  || — || December 16, 2003 || Anderson Mesa || LONEOS || — || align=right | 6.9 km || 
|-id=649 bgcolor=#E9E9E9
| 206649 ||  || — || December 16, 2003 || Catalina || CSS || DOR || align=right | 4.9 km || 
|-id=650 bgcolor=#E9E9E9
| 206650 ||  || — || December 17, 2003 || Socorro || LINEAR || — || align=right | 3.3 km || 
|-id=651 bgcolor=#E9E9E9
| 206651 ||  || — || December 18, 2003 || Socorro || LINEAR || — || align=right | 3.9 km || 
|-id=652 bgcolor=#E9E9E9
| 206652 ||  || — || December 18, 2003 || Socorro || LINEAR || — || align=right | 3.2 km || 
|-id=653 bgcolor=#d6d6d6
| 206653 ||  || — || December 18, 2003 || Kitt Peak || Spacewatch || — || align=right | 4.9 km || 
|-id=654 bgcolor=#E9E9E9
| 206654 ||  || — || December 17, 2003 || Palomar || NEAT || — || align=right | 3.2 km || 
|-id=655 bgcolor=#E9E9E9
| 206655 ||  || — || December 19, 2003 || Socorro || LINEAR || — || align=right | 3.8 km || 
|-id=656 bgcolor=#d6d6d6
| 206656 ||  || — || December 17, 2003 || Kitt Peak || Spacewatch || KOR || align=right | 1.9 km || 
|-id=657 bgcolor=#d6d6d6
| 206657 ||  || — || December 19, 2003 || Kitt Peak || Spacewatch || — || align=right | 3.2 km || 
|-id=658 bgcolor=#d6d6d6
| 206658 ||  || — || December 19, 2003 || Kitt Peak || Spacewatch || KOR || align=right | 1.8 km || 
|-id=659 bgcolor=#d6d6d6
| 206659 ||  || — || December 19, 2003 || Kitt Peak || Spacewatch || THM || align=right | 3.1 km || 
|-id=660 bgcolor=#E9E9E9
| 206660 ||  || — || December 18, 2003 || Socorro || LINEAR || WIT || align=right | 1.6 km || 
|-id=661 bgcolor=#d6d6d6
| 206661 ||  || — || December 19, 2003 || Kitt Peak || Spacewatch || FIR || align=right | 5.3 km || 
|-id=662 bgcolor=#E9E9E9
| 206662 ||  || — || December 19, 2003 || Socorro || LINEAR || — || align=right | 3.2 km || 
|-id=663 bgcolor=#E9E9E9
| 206663 ||  || — || December 20, 2003 || Socorro || LINEAR || HEN || align=right | 1.8 km || 
|-id=664 bgcolor=#E9E9E9
| 206664 ||  || — || December 18, 2003 || Socorro || LINEAR || — || align=right | 3.2 km || 
|-id=665 bgcolor=#E9E9E9
| 206665 ||  || — || December 18, 2003 || Socorro || LINEAR || — || align=right | 2.7 km || 
|-id=666 bgcolor=#d6d6d6
| 206666 ||  || — || December 18, 2003 || Socorro || LINEAR || JLI || align=right | 5.5 km || 
|-id=667 bgcolor=#d6d6d6
| 206667 ||  || — || December 18, 2003 || Socorro || LINEAR || — || align=right | 2.5 km || 
|-id=668 bgcolor=#E9E9E9
| 206668 ||  || — || December 19, 2003 || Socorro || LINEAR || — || align=right | 4.0 km || 
|-id=669 bgcolor=#E9E9E9
| 206669 ||  || — || December 19, 2003 || Socorro || LINEAR || — || align=right | 3.5 km || 
|-id=670 bgcolor=#d6d6d6
| 206670 ||  || — || December 19, 2003 || Socorro || LINEAR || URS || align=right | 5.6 km || 
|-id=671 bgcolor=#E9E9E9
| 206671 ||  || — || December 19, 2003 || Socorro || LINEAR || — || align=right | 2.9 km || 
|-id=672 bgcolor=#E9E9E9
| 206672 ||  || — || December 23, 2003 || Socorro || LINEAR || — || align=right | 3.8 km || 
|-id=673 bgcolor=#E9E9E9
| 206673 ||  || — || December 27, 2003 || Desert Eagle || W. K. Y. Yeung || WIT || align=right | 1.5 km || 
|-id=674 bgcolor=#E9E9E9
| 206674 ||  || — || December 23, 2003 || Socorro || LINEAR || EUN || align=right | 2.1 km || 
|-id=675 bgcolor=#E9E9E9
| 206675 ||  || — || December 25, 2003 || Kitt Peak || Spacewatch || — || align=right | 4.2 km || 
|-id=676 bgcolor=#E9E9E9
| 206676 ||  || — || December 27, 2003 || Socorro || LINEAR || — || align=right | 2.9 km || 
|-id=677 bgcolor=#d6d6d6
| 206677 ||  || — || December 27, 2003 || Socorro || LINEAR || LIX || align=right | 5.3 km || 
|-id=678 bgcolor=#d6d6d6
| 206678 ||  || — || December 27, 2003 || Socorro || LINEAR || — || align=right | 5.4 km || 
|-id=679 bgcolor=#E9E9E9
| 206679 ||  || — || December 28, 2003 || Socorro || LINEAR || — || align=right | 3.9 km || 
|-id=680 bgcolor=#d6d6d6
| 206680 ||  || — || December 28, 2003 || Socorro || LINEAR || — || align=right | 4.3 km || 
|-id=681 bgcolor=#d6d6d6
| 206681 ||  || — || December 28, 2003 || Socorro || LINEAR || EUP || align=right | 7.1 km || 
|-id=682 bgcolor=#d6d6d6
| 206682 ||  || — || December 28, 2003 || Socorro || LINEAR || — || align=right | 5.4 km || 
|-id=683 bgcolor=#d6d6d6
| 206683 ||  || — || December 28, 2003 || Socorro || LINEAR || — || align=right | 3.6 km || 
|-id=684 bgcolor=#d6d6d6
| 206684 ||  || — || December 28, 2003 || Socorro || LINEAR || BRA || align=right | 2.1 km || 
|-id=685 bgcolor=#d6d6d6
| 206685 ||  || — || December 28, 2003 || Socorro || LINEAR || — || align=right | 3.8 km || 
|-id=686 bgcolor=#E9E9E9
| 206686 ||  || — || December 28, 2003 || Socorro || LINEAR || HOF || align=right | 3.9 km || 
|-id=687 bgcolor=#E9E9E9
| 206687 ||  || — || December 29, 2003 || Socorro || LINEAR || EUN || align=right | 2.4 km || 
|-id=688 bgcolor=#d6d6d6
| 206688 ||  || — || December 29, 2003 || Catalina || CSS || SAN || align=right | 2.5 km || 
|-id=689 bgcolor=#d6d6d6
| 206689 ||  || — || December 30, 2003 || Socorro || LINEAR || EUP || align=right | 5.1 km || 
|-id=690 bgcolor=#E9E9E9
| 206690 ||  || — || December 16, 2003 || Kitt Peak || Spacewatch || WIT || align=right | 1.6 km || 
|-id=691 bgcolor=#E9E9E9
| 206691 ||  || — || December 16, 2003 || Kitt Peak || Spacewatch || — || align=right | 2.7 km || 
|-id=692 bgcolor=#E9E9E9
| 206692 ||  || — || December 16, 2003 || Kitt Peak || Spacewatch || WIT || align=right | 1.5 km || 
|-id=693 bgcolor=#E9E9E9
| 206693 ||  || — || December 17, 2003 || Socorro || LINEAR || — || align=right | 3.7 km || 
|-id=694 bgcolor=#E9E9E9
| 206694 ||  || — || December 18, 2003 || Kitt Peak || Spacewatch || — || align=right | 3.8 km || 
|-id=695 bgcolor=#E9E9E9
| 206695 ||  || — || January 13, 2004 || Anderson Mesa || LONEOS || — || align=right | 3.3 km || 
|-id=696 bgcolor=#E9E9E9
| 206696 ||  || — || January 13, 2004 || Anderson Mesa || LONEOS || HOF || align=right | 4.2 km || 
|-id=697 bgcolor=#d6d6d6
| 206697 ||  || — || January 14, 2004 || Palomar || NEAT || — || align=right | 6.1 km || 
|-id=698 bgcolor=#E9E9E9
| 206698 ||  || — || January 13, 2004 || Kitt Peak || Spacewatch || — || align=right | 3.4 km || 
|-id=699 bgcolor=#E9E9E9
| 206699 ||  || — || January 16, 2004 || Palomar || NEAT || — || align=right | 4.1 km || 
|-id=700 bgcolor=#E9E9E9
| 206700 ||  || — || January 16, 2004 || Palomar || NEAT || — || align=right | 3.7 km || 
|}

206701–206800 

|-bgcolor=#d6d6d6
| 206701 ||  || — || January 16, 2004 || Palomar || NEAT || — || align=right | 5.4 km || 
|-id=702 bgcolor=#E9E9E9
| 206702 ||  || — || January 16, 2004 || Palomar || NEAT || — || align=right | 2.3 km || 
|-id=703 bgcolor=#d6d6d6
| 206703 ||  || — || January 17, 2004 || Palomar || NEAT || — || align=right | 3.9 km || 
|-id=704 bgcolor=#d6d6d6
| 206704 ||  || — || January 19, 2004 || Kitt Peak || Spacewatch || — || align=right | 6.8 km || 
|-id=705 bgcolor=#d6d6d6
| 206705 ||  || — || January 19, 2004 || Kitt Peak || Spacewatch || — || align=right | 3.8 km || 
|-id=706 bgcolor=#E9E9E9
| 206706 ||  || — || January 19, 2004 || Kitt Peak || Spacewatch || — || align=right | 3.7 km || 
|-id=707 bgcolor=#d6d6d6
| 206707 ||  || — || January 19, 2004 || Kitt Peak || Spacewatch || — || align=right | 4.2 km || 
|-id=708 bgcolor=#d6d6d6
| 206708 ||  || — || January 19, 2004 || Kitt Peak || Spacewatch || KOR || align=right | 1.7 km || 
|-id=709 bgcolor=#E9E9E9
| 206709 ||  || — || January 19, 2004 || Kitt Peak || Spacewatch || — || align=right | 3.3 km || 
|-id=710 bgcolor=#d6d6d6
| 206710 ||  || — || January 19, 2004 || Kitt Peak || Spacewatch || — || align=right | 4.7 km || 
|-id=711 bgcolor=#d6d6d6
| 206711 ||  || — || January 21, 2004 || Socorro || LINEAR || — || align=right | 5.1 km || 
|-id=712 bgcolor=#d6d6d6
| 206712 ||  || — || January 19, 2004 || Socorro || LINEAR || BRA || align=right | 2.3 km || 
|-id=713 bgcolor=#d6d6d6
| 206713 ||  || — || January 19, 2004 || Catalina || CSS || — || align=right | 4.3 km || 
|-id=714 bgcolor=#d6d6d6
| 206714 ||  || — || January 21, 2004 || Socorro || LINEAR || EOS || align=right | 2.8 km || 
|-id=715 bgcolor=#d6d6d6
| 206715 ||  || — || January 21, 2004 || Socorro || LINEAR || — || align=right | 5.6 km || 
|-id=716 bgcolor=#d6d6d6
| 206716 ||  || — || January 21, 2004 || Socorro || LINEAR || — || align=right | 3.7 km || 
|-id=717 bgcolor=#d6d6d6
| 206717 ||  || — || January 21, 2004 || Socorro || LINEAR || — || align=right | 6.1 km || 
|-id=718 bgcolor=#d6d6d6
| 206718 ||  || — || January 21, 2004 || Socorro || LINEAR || CHA || align=right | 3.4 km || 
|-id=719 bgcolor=#d6d6d6
| 206719 ||  || — || January 21, 2004 || Socorro || LINEAR || — || align=right | 4.5 km || 
|-id=720 bgcolor=#d6d6d6
| 206720 ||  || — || January 23, 2004 || Socorro || LINEAR || — || align=right | 4.3 km || 
|-id=721 bgcolor=#d6d6d6
| 206721 ||  || — || January 23, 2004 || Socorro || LINEAR || — || align=right | 5.4 km || 
|-id=722 bgcolor=#d6d6d6
| 206722 ||  || — || January 22, 2004 || Socorro || LINEAR || — || align=right | 3.0 km || 
|-id=723 bgcolor=#E9E9E9
| 206723 ||  || — || January 23, 2004 || Socorro || LINEAR || — || align=right | 2.9 km || 
|-id=724 bgcolor=#d6d6d6
| 206724 ||  || — || January 24, 2004 || Socorro || LINEAR || — || align=right | 3.8 km || 
|-id=725 bgcolor=#E9E9E9
| 206725 ||  || — || January 24, 2004 || Socorro || LINEAR || — || align=right | 3.1 km || 
|-id=726 bgcolor=#d6d6d6
| 206726 ||  || — || January 24, 2004 || Socorro || LINEAR || — || align=right | 3.0 km || 
|-id=727 bgcolor=#d6d6d6
| 206727 ||  || — || January 22, 2004 || Socorro || LINEAR || KOR || align=right | 1.8 km || 
|-id=728 bgcolor=#d6d6d6
| 206728 ||  || — || January 22, 2004 || Socorro || LINEAR || — || align=right | 3.9 km || 
|-id=729 bgcolor=#E9E9E9
| 206729 ||  || — || January 24, 2004 || Socorro || LINEAR || — || align=right | 3.3 km || 
|-id=730 bgcolor=#E9E9E9
| 206730 ||  || — || January 24, 2004 || Socorro || LINEAR || — || align=right | 4.1 km || 
|-id=731 bgcolor=#d6d6d6
| 206731 ||  || — || January 27, 2004 || Kitt Peak || Spacewatch || — || align=right | 5.1 km || 
|-id=732 bgcolor=#d6d6d6
| 206732 ||  || — || January 27, 2004 || Kitt Peak || Spacewatch || THB || align=right | 3.7 km || 
|-id=733 bgcolor=#E9E9E9
| 206733 ||  || — || January 28, 2004 || Kitt Peak || Spacewatch || AGN || align=right | 1.7 km || 
|-id=734 bgcolor=#d6d6d6
| 206734 ||  || — || January 24, 2004 || Socorro || LINEAR || — || align=right | 3.1 km || 
|-id=735 bgcolor=#d6d6d6
| 206735 ||  || — || January 30, 2004 || Kitt Peak || Spacewatch || — || align=right | 3.9 km || 
|-id=736 bgcolor=#d6d6d6
| 206736 ||  || — || January 30, 2004 || Socorro || LINEAR || EOS || align=right | 3.1 km || 
|-id=737 bgcolor=#d6d6d6
| 206737 ||  || — || January 30, 2004 || Catalina || CSS || — || align=right | 3.2 km || 
|-id=738 bgcolor=#d6d6d6
| 206738 ||  || — || January 30, 2004 || Catalina || CSS || — || align=right | 4.0 km || 
|-id=739 bgcolor=#d6d6d6
| 206739 ||  || — || January 31, 2004 || Catalina || CSS || — || align=right | 6.0 km || 
|-id=740 bgcolor=#d6d6d6
| 206740 ||  || — || January 18, 2004 || Palomar || NEAT || — || align=right | 3.6 km || 
|-id=741 bgcolor=#d6d6d6
| 206741 ||  || — || January 16, 2004 || Catalina || CSS || 629 || align=right | 2.1 km || 
|-id=742 bgcolor=#d6d6d6
| 206742 ||  || — || January 16, 2004 || Palomar || NEAT || — || align=right | 3.4 km || 
|-id=743 bgcolor=#d6d6d6
| 206743 ||  || — || January 16, 2004 || Kitt Peak || Spacewatch || — || align=right | 4.1 km || 
|-id=744 bgcolor=#d6d6d6
| 206744 ||  || — || January 19, 2004 || Kitt Peak || Spacewatch || KOR || align=right | 2.1 km || 
|-id=745 bgcolor=#d6d6d6
| 206745 ||  || — || January 19, 2004 || Kitt Peak || Spacewatch || — || align=right | 2.9 km || 
|-id=746 bgcolor=#d6d6d6
| 206746 ||  || — || January 19, 2004 || Kitt Peak || Spacewatch || KOR || align=right | 1.8 km || 
|-id=747 bgcolor=#d6d6d6
| 206747 ||  || — || January 19, 2004 || Kitt Peak || Spacewatch || KOR || align=right | 2.0 km || 
|-id=748 bgcolor=#d6d6d6
| 206748 ||  || — || January 22, 2004 || Socorro || LINEAR || THM || align=right | 3.2 km || 
|-id=749 bgcolor=#d6d6d6
| 206749 ||  || — || January 16, 2004 || Kitt Peak || Spacewatch || KOR || align=right | 2.0 km || 
|-id=750 bgcolor=#E9E9E9
| 206750 ||  || — || January 16, 2004 || Kitt Peak || Spacewatch || HEN || align=right | 1.5 km || 
|-id=751 bgcolor=#E9E9E9
| 206751 ||  || — || January 16, 2004 || Kitt Peak || Spacewatch || — || align=right | 2.8 km || 
|-id=752 bgcolor=#d6d6d6
| 206752 ||  || — || January 17, 2004 || Haleakala || NEAT || — || align=right | 4.5 km || 
|-id=753 bgcolor=#d6d6d6
| 206753 ||  || — || January 18, 2004 || Kitt Peak || Spacewatch || — || align=right | 4.3 km || 
|-id=754 bgcolor=#d6d6d6
| 206754 ||  || — || January 28, 2004 || Kitt Peak || Spacewatch || — || align=right | 2.5 km || 
|-id=755 bgcolor=#d6d6d6
| 206755 ||  || — || February 12, 2004 || Wrightwood || J. W. Young || TIR || align=right | 2.4 km || 
|-id=756 bgcolor=#d6d6d6
| 206756 ||  || — || February 10, 2004 || Palomar || NEAT || — || align=right | 4.6 km || 
|-id=757 bgcolor=#d6d6d6
| 206757 ||  || — || February 10, 2004 || Catalina || CSS || EOS || align=right | 3.1 km || 
|-id=758 bgcolor=#d6d6d6
| 206758 ||  || — || February 11, 2004 || Palomar || NEAT || — || align=right | 3.4 km || 
|-id=759 bgcolor=#d6d6d6
| 206759 ||  || — || February 9, 2004 || Nogales || Tenagra II Obs. || KAR || align=right | 1.7 km || 
|-id=760 bgcolor=#d6d6d6
| 206760 ||  || — || February 11, 2004 || Palomar || NEAT || HYG || align=right | 2.9 km || 
|-id=761 bgcolor=#d6d6d6
| 206761 ||  || — || February 11, 2004 || Palomar || NEAT || EOS || align=right | 3.0 km || 
|-id=762 bgcolor=#d6d6d6
| 206762 ||  || — || February 11, 2004 || Palomar || NEAT || — || align=right | 5.9 km || 
|-id=763 bgcolor=#d6d6d6
| 206763 ||  || — || February 11, 2004 || Palomar || NEAT || — || align=right | 3.6 km || 
|-id=764 bgcolor=#d6d6d6
| 206764 ||  || — || February 12, 2004 || Desert Eagle || W. K. Y. Yeung || EOS || align=right | 2.8 km || 
|-id=765 bgcolor=#d6d6d6
| 206765 ||  || — || February 11, 2004 || Kitt Peak || Spacewatch || CHA || align=right | 2.8 km || 
|-id=766 bgcolor=#d6d6d6
| 206766 ||  || — || February 12, 2004 || Kitt Peak || Spacewatch || — || align=right | 2.8 km || 
|-id=767 bgcolor=#d6d6d6
| 206767 ||  || — || February 12, 2004 || Kitt Peak || Spacewatch || KOR || align=right | 1.3 km || 
|-id=768 bgcolor=#E9E9E9
| 206768 ||  || — || February 12, 2004 || Palomar || NEAT || GEF || align=right | 2.3 km || 
|-id=769 bgcolor=#d6d6d6
| 206769 ||  || — || February 12, 2004 || Kitt Peak || Spacewatch || — || align=right | 3.7 km || 
|-id=770 bgcolor=#d6d6d6
| 206770 ||  || — || February 14, 2004 || Haleakala || NEAT || MEL || align=right | 4.0 km || 
|-id=771 bgcolor=#d6d6d6
| 206771 ||  || — || February 11, 2004 || Kitt Peak || Spacewatch || — || align=right | 4.5 km || 
|-id=772 bgcolor=#d6d6d6
| 206772 ||  || — || February 12, 2004 || Palomar || NEAT || — || align=right | 4.0 km || 
|-id=773 bgcolor=#E9E9E9
| 206773 ||  || — || February 13, 2004 || Kitt Peak || Spacewatch || DOR || align=right | 4.3 km || 
|-id=774 bgcolor=#d6d6d6
| 206774 ||  || — || February 13, 2004 || Kitt Peak || Spacewatch || — || align=right | 3.5 km || 
|-id=775 bgcolor=#d6d6d6
| 206775 ||  || — || February 13, 2004 || Kitt Peak || Spacewatch || HYG || align=right | 3.7 km || 
|-id=776 bgcolor=#d6d6d6
| 206776 ||  || — || February 11, 2004 || Palomar || NEAT || — || align=right | 3.0 km || 
|-id=777 bgcolor=#d6d6d6
| 206777 ||  || — || February 11, 2004 || Kitt Peak || Spacewatch || — || align=right | 3.9 km || 
|-id=778 bgcolor=#d6d6d6
| 206778 ||  || — || February 14, 2004 || Haleakala || NEAT || URS || align=right | 4.0 km || 
|-id=779 bgcolor=#d6d6d6
| 206779 ||  || — || February 14, 2004 || Socorro || LINEAR || — || align=right | 3.6 km || 
|-id=780 bgcolor=#d6d6d6
| 206780 ||  || — || February 14, 2004 || Palomar || NEAT || — || align=right | 4.4 km || 
|-id=781 bgcolor=#d6d6d6
| 206781 ||  || — || February 12, 2004 || Palomar || NEAT || — || align=right | 6.9 km || 
|-id=782 bgcolor=#d6d6d6
| 206782 ||  || — || February 14, 2004 || Palomar || NEAT || VER || align=right | 4.2 km || 
|-id=783 bgcolor=#d6d6d6
| 206783 ||  || — || February 13, 2004 || Anderson Mesa || LONEOS || NAE || align=right | 4.6 km || 
|-id=784 bgcolor=#d6d6d6
| 206784 ||  || — || February 2, 2004 || Socorro || LINEAR || — || align=right | 3.1 km || 
|-id=785 bgcolor=#d6d6d6
| 206785 ||  || — || February 11, 2004 || Kitt Peak || Spacewatch || — || align=right | 3.9 km || 
|-id=786 bgcolor=#d6d6d6
| 206786 ||  || — || February 12, 2004 || Kitt Peak || Spacewatch || CHA || align=right | 3.0 km || 
|-id=787 bgcolor=#d6d6d6
| 206787 || 2004 DQ || — || February 16, 2004 || Kitt Peak || Spacewatch || — || align=right | 3.0 km || 
|-id=788 bgcolor=#FA8072
| 206788 ||  || — || February 16, 2004 || Socorro || LINEAR || H || align=right | 1.1 km || 
|-id=789 bgcolor=#d6d6d6
| 206789 ||  || — || February 17, 2004 || Kitt Peak || Spacewatch || KOR || align=right | 1.9 km || 
|-id=790 bgcolor=#d6d6d6
| 206790 ||  || — || February 16, 2004 || Catalina || CSS || URS || align=right | 6.5 km || 
|-id=791 bgcolor=#d6d6d6
| 206791 ||  || — || February 16, 2004 || Socorro || LINEAR || — || align=right | 4.0 km || 
|-id=792 bgcolor=#d6d6d6
| 206792 ||  || — || February 16, 2004 || Kitt Peak || Spacewatch || — || align=right | 5.7 km || 
|-id=793 bgcolor=#d6d6d6
| 206793 ||  || — || February 19, 2004 || Socorro || LINEAR || — || align=right | 3.0 km || 
|-id=794 bgcolor=#d6d6d6
| 206794 ||  || — || February 17, 2004 || Socorro || LINEAR || KOR || align=right | 2.0 km || 
|-id=795 bgcolor=#d6d6d6
| 206795 ||  || — || February 17, 2004 || Socorro || LINEAR || EMA || align=right | 5.0 km || 
|-id=796 bgcolor=#d6d6d6
| 206796 ||  || — || February 18, 2004 || Kitt Peak || Spacewatch || — || align=right | 5.3 km || 
|-id=797 bgcolor=#d6d6d6
| 206797 ||  || — || February 19, 2004 || Socorro || LINEAR || — || align=right | 4.1 km || 
|-id=798 bgcolor=#d6d6d6
| 206798 ||  || — || February 16, 2004 || Kitt Peak || Spacewatch || — || align=right | 3.9 km || 
|-id=799 bgcolor=#d6d6d6
| 206799 ||  || — || February 23, 2004 || Socorro || LINEAR || NAE || align=right | 2.9 km || 
|-id=800 bgcolor=#d6d6d6
| 206800 ||  || — || February 24, 2004 || Haleakala || NEAT || EUP || align=right | 8.8 km || 
|}

206801–206900 

|-bgcolor=#d6d6d6
| 206801 ||  || — || February 19, 2004 || Socorro || LINEAR || EOS || align=right | 3.6 km || 
|-id=802 bgcolor=#d6d6d6
| 206802 ||  || — || February 19, 2004 || Socorro || LINEAR || EMA || align=right | 4.6 km || 
|-id=803 bgcolor=#d6d6d6
| 206803 ||  || — || February 20, 2004 || Haleakala || NEAT || — || align=right | 3.7 km || 
|-id=804 bgcolor=#d6d6d6
| 206804 ||  || — || February 22, 2004 || Kitt Peak || Spacewatch || EOS || align=right | 2.9 km || 
|-id=805 bgcolor=#d6d6d6
| 206805 ||  || — || February 23, 2004 || Socorro || LINEAR || — || align=right | 5.2 km || 
|-id=806 bgcolor=#d6d6d6
| 206806 ||  || — || February 23, 2004 || Socorro || LINEAR || — || align=right | 4.5 km || 
|-id=807 bgcolor=#d6d6d6
| 206807 ||  || — || February 25, 2004 || Socorro || LINEAR || — || align=right | 4.4 km || 
|-id=808 bgcolor=#d6d6d6
| 206808 ||  || — || February 22, 2004 || Kitt Peak || Spacewatch || — || align=right | 2.7 km || 
|-id=809 bgcolor=#d6d6d6
| 206809 ||  || — || February 23, 2004 || Socorro || LINEAR || — || align=right | 3.1 km || 
|-id=810 bgcolor=#d6d6d6
| 206810 ||  || — || February 23, 2004 || Socorro || LINEAR || — || align=right | 4.2 km || 
|-id=811 bgcolor=#d6d6d6
| 206811 ||  || — || February 26, 2004 || Socorro || LINEAR || — || align=right | 3.3 km || 
|-id=812 bgcolor=#d6d6d6
| 206812 ||  || — || February 29, 2004 || Kitt Peak || Spacewatch || KOR || align=right | 2.1 km || 
|-id=813 bgcolor=#d6d6d6
| 206813 ||  || — || February 16, 2004 || Kitt Peak || Spacewatch || — || align=right | 5.1 km || 
|-id=814 bgcolor=#d6d6d6
| 206814 ||  || — || February 18, 2004 || Haleakala || NEAT || URS || align=right | 5.5 km || 
|-id=815 bgcolor=#d6d6d6
| 206815 ||  || — || March 11, 2004 || Palomar || NEAT || — || align=right | 4.6 km || 
|-id=816 bgcolor=#d6d6d6
| 206816 ||  || — || March 11, 2004 || Palomar || NEAT || — || align=right | 5.8 km || 
|-id=817 bgcolor=#d6d6d6
| 206817 ||  || — || March 14, 2004 || Kitt Peak || Spacewatch || — || align=right | 3.2 km || 
|-id=818 bgcolor=#d6d6d6
| 206818 ||  || — || March 10, 2004 || Palomar || NEAT || — || align=right | 3.0 km || 
|-id=819 bgcolor=#d6d6d6
| 206819 ||  || — || March 11, 2004 || Palomar || NEAT || HYG || align=right | 4.8 km || 
|-id=820 bgcolor=#d6d6d6
| 206820 ||  || — || March 11, 2004 || Palomar || NEAT || — || align=right | 3.7 km || 
|-id=821 bgcolor=#d6d6d6
| 206821 ||  || — || March 11, 2004 || Palomar || NEAT || — || align=right | 5.9 km || 
|-id=822 bgcolor=#d6d6d6
| 206822 ||  || — || March 12, 2004 || Palomar || NEAT || — || align=right | 5.0 km || 
|-id=823 bgcolor=#d6d6d6
| 206823 ||  || — || March 14, 2004 || Socorro || LINEAR || — || align=right | 4.2 km || 
|-id=824 bgcolor=#d6d6d6
| 206824 ||  || — || March 14, 2004 || Kitt Peak || Spacewatch || EOS || align=right | 3.2 km || 
|-id=825 bgcolor=#d6d6d6
| 206825 ||  || — || March 15, 2004 || Kitt Peak || Spacewatch || HYG || align=right | 3.4 km || 
|-id=826 bgcolor=#d6d6d6
| 206826 ||  || — || March 15, 2004 || Socorro || LINEAR || — || align=right | 4.9 km || 
|-id=827 bgcolor=#d6d6d6
| 206827 ||  || — || March 14, 2004 || Palomar || NEAT || EUP || align=right | 6.5 km || 
|-id=828 bgcolor=#d6d6d6
| 206828 ||  || — || March 14, 2004 || Kitt Peak || Spacewatch || KOR || align=right | 2.4 km || 
|-id=829 bgcolor=#d6d6d6
| 206829 ||  || — || March 15, 2004 || Socorro || LINEAR || — || align=right | 4.7 km || 
|-id=830 bgcolor=#d6d6d6
| 206830 ||  || — || March 15, 2004 || Catalina || CSS || HYG || align=right | 3.7 km || 
|-id=831 bgcolor=#d6d6d6
| 206831 ||  || — || March 15, 2004 || Kitt Peak || Spacewatch || — || align=right | 3.8 km || 
|-id=832 bgcolor=#d6d6d6
| 206832 ||  || — || March 15, 2004 || Socorro || LINEAR || — || align=right | 3.4 km || 
|-id=833 bgcolor=#d6d6d6
| 206833 ||  || — || March 15, 2004 || Kitt Peak || Spacewatch || — || align=right | 5.1 km || 
|-id=834 bgcolor=#d6d6d6
| 206834 ||  || — || March 14, 2004 || Palomar || NEAT || — || align=right | 2.9 km || 
|-id=835 bgcolor=#d6d6d6
| 206835 ||  || — || March 14, 2004 || Palomar || NEAT || — || align=right | 5.2 km || 
|-id=836 bgcolor=#d6d6d6
| 206836 ||  || — || March 12, 2004 || Palomar || NEAT || HYG || align=right | 5.0 km || 
|-id=837 bgcolor=#d6d6d6
| 206837 ||  || — || March 15, 2004 || Socorro || LINEAR || — || align=right | 4.4 km || 
|-id=838 bgcolor=#d6d6d6
| 206838 ||  || — || March 15, 2004 || Kitt Peak || Spacewatch || THM || align=right | 2.9 km || 
|-id=839 bgcolor=#d6d6d6
| 206839 ||  || — || March 15, 2004 || Kitt Peak || Spacewatch || — || align=right | 4.5 km || 
|-id=840 bgcolor=#d6d6d6
| 206840 ||  || — || March 14, 2004 || Socorro || LINEAR || — || align=right | 5.3 km || 
|-id=841 bgcolor=#d6d6d6
| 206841 ||  || — || March 15, 2004 || Socorro || LINEAR || — || align=right | 5.8 km || 
|-id=842 bgcolor=#d6d6d6
| 206842 ||  || — || March 15, 2004 || Socorro || LINEAR || MEL || align=right | 5.0 km || 
|-id=843 bgcolor=#d6d6d6
| 206843 ||  || — || March 15, 2004 || Socorro || LINEAR || — || align=right | 3.6 km || 
|-id=844 bgcolor=#d6d6d6
| 206844 ||  || — || March 14, 2004 || Kitt Peak || Spacewatch || EOS || align=right | 2.9 km || 
|-id=845 bgcolor=#d6d6d6
| 206845 ||  || — || March 15, 2004 || Socorro || LINEAR || EMA || align=right | 6.4 km || 
|-id=846 bgcolor=#d6d6d6
| 206846 ||  || — || March 11, 2004 || Palomar || NEAT || HYG || align=right | 3.7 km || 
|-id=847 bgcolor=#d6d6d6
| 206847 ||  || — || March 15, 2004 || Kitt Peak || Spacewatch || — || align=right | 3.0 km || 
|-id=848 bgcolor=#d6d6d6
| 206848 ||  || — || March 15, 2004 || Kitt Peak || Spacewatch || — || align=right | 5.8 km || 
|-id=849 bgcolor=#d6d6d6
| 206849 ||  || — || March 28, 2004 || Socorro || LINEAR || Tj (2.98) || align=right | 8.4 km || 
|-id=850 bgcolor=#d6d6d6
| 206850 ||  || — || March 16, 2004 || Catalina || CSS || — || align=right | 6.0 km || 
|-id=851 bgcolor=#d6d6d6
| 206851 ||  || — || March 17, 2004 || Kitt Peak || Spacewatch || THM || align=right | 3.4 km || 
|-id=852 bgcolor=#d6d6d6
| 206852 ||  || — || March 17, 2004 || Socorro || LINEAR || — || align=right | 4.9 km || 
|-id=853 bgcolor=#fefefe
| 206853 ||  || — || March 23, 2004 || Socorro || LINEAR || H || align=right data-sort-value="0.88" | 880 m || 
|-id=854 bgcolor=#fefefe
| 206854 ||  || — || March 29, 2004 || Socorro || LINEAR || H || align=right data-sort-value="0.99" | 990 m || 
|-id=855 bgcolor=#d6d6d6
| 206855 ||  || — || March 30, 2004 || Socorro || LINEAR || EUP || align=right | 6.0 km || 
|-id=856 bgcolor=#d6d6d6
| 206856 ||  || — || March 16, 2004 || Socorro || LINEAR || — || align=right | 4.7 km || 
|-id=857 bgcolor=#d6d6d6
| 206857 ||  || — || March 19, 2004 || Socorro || LINEAR || — || align=right | 3.1 km || 
|-id=858 bgcolor=#d6d6d6
| 206858 ||  || — || March 16, 2004 || Kitt Peak || Spacewatch || — || align=right | 3.2 km || 
|-id=859 bgcolor=#d6d6d6
| 206859 ||  || — || March 19, 2004 || Kitt Peak || Spacewatch || — || align=right | 3.8 km || 
|-id=860 bgcolor=#fefefe
| 206860 ||  || — || March 16, 2004 || Socorro || LINEAR || FLO || align=right data-sort-value="0.90" | 900 m || 
|-id=861 bgcolor=#d6d6d6
| 206861 ||  || — || March 16, 2004 || Kitt Peak || Spacewatch || — || align=right | 4.0 km || 
|-id=862 bgcolor=#d6d6d6
| 206862 ||  || — || March 19, 2004 || Socorro || LINEAR || — || align=right | 3.5 km || 
|-id=863 bgcolor=#d6d6d6
| 206863 ||  || — || March 16, 2004 || Valmeca || Valmeca Obs. || — || align=right | 5.0 km || 
|-id=864 bgcolor=#d6d6d6
| 206864 ||  || — || March 19, 2004 || Kitt Peak || Spacewatch || THM || align=right | 3.4 km || 
|-id=865 bgcolor=#d6d6d6
| 206865 ||  || — || March 16, 2004 || Socorro || LINEAR || — || align=right | 7.3 km || 
|-id=866 bgcolor=#d6d6d6
| 206866 ||  || — || March 18, 2004 || Kitt Peak || Spacewatch || — || align=right | 4.8 km || 
|-id=867 bgcolor=#d6d6d6
| 206867 ||  || — || March 19, 2004 || Palomar || NEAT || — || align=right | 5.5 km || 
|-id=868 bgcolor=#d6d6d6
| 206868 ||  || — || March 20, 2004 || Kitt Peak || Spacewatch || — || align=right | 5.9 km || 
|-id=869 bgcolor=#d6d6d6
| 206869 ||  || — || March 18, 2004 || Socorro || LINEAR || — || align=right | 3.4 km || 
|-id=870 bgcolor=#d6d6d6
| 206870 ||  || — || March 22, 2004 || Socorro || LINEAR || 637 || align=right | 3.5 km || 
|-id=871 bgcolor=#d6d6d6
| 206871 ||  || — || March 26, 2004 || Kitt Peak || Spacewatch || HYG || align=right | 3.3 km || 
|-id=872 bgcolor=#d6d6d6
| 206872 ||  || — || March 22, 2004 || Socorro || LINEAR || EOS || align=right | 3.0 km || 
|-id=873 bgcolor=#d6d6d6
| 206873 ||  || — || March 23, 2004 || Socorro || LINEAR || — || align=right | 5.2 km || 
|-id=874 bgcolor=#d6d6d6
| 206874 ||  || — || March 23, 2004 || Socorro || LINEAR || — || align=right | 4.4 km || 
|-id=875 bgcolor=#d6d6d6
| 206875 ||  || — || March 27, 2004 || Socorro || LINEAR || — || align=right | 5.4 km || 
|-id=876 bgcolor=#d6d6d6
| 206876 ||  || — || March 27, 2004 || Socorro || LINEAR || — || align=right | 3.4 km || 
|-id=877 bgcolor=#d6d6d6
| 206877 ||  || — || March 20, 2004 || Anderson Mesa || LONEOS || — || align=right | 4.1 km || 
|-id=878 bgcolor=#d6d6d6
| 206878 ||  || — || March 29, 2004 || Catalina || CSS || — || align=right | 7.0 km || 
|-id=879 bgcolor=#d6d6d6
| 206879 ||  || — || March 17, 2004 || Socorro || LINEAR || — || align=right | 5.7 km || 
|-id=880 bgcolor=#d6d6d6
| 206880 ||  || — || March 17, 2004 || Kitt Peak || Spacewatch || — || align=right | 3.4 km || 
|-id=881 bgcolor=#d6d6d6
| 206881 ||  || — || March 18, 2004 || Socorro || LINEAR || — || align=right | 3.6 km || 
|-id=882 bgcolor=#d6d6d6
| 206882 ||  || — || April 9, 2004 || Palomar || NEAT || — || align=right | 6.1 km || 
|-id=883 bgcolor=#d6d6d6
| 206883 ||  || — || April 12, 2004 || Socorro || LINEAR || ALA || align=right | 4.8 km || 
|-id=884 bgcolor=#d6d6d6
| 206884 ||  || — || April 8, 2004 || Palomar || NEAT || — || align=right | 4.5 km || 
|-id=885 bgcolor=#d6d6d6
| 206885 ||  || — || April 12, 2004 || Catalina || CSS || EUP || align=right | 4.6 km || 
|-id=886 bgcolor=#fefefe
| 206886 ||  || — || April 14, 2004 || Socorro || LINEAR || H || align=right data-sort-value="0.78" | 780 m || 
|-id=887 bgcolor=#fefefe
| 206887 ||  || — || April 15, 2004 || Siding Spring || SSS || — || align=right data-sort-value="0.93" | 930 m || 
|-id=888 bgcolor=#d6d6d6
| 206888 ||  || — || April 11, 2004 || Palomar || NEAT || — || align=right | 3.9 km || 
|-id=889 bgcolor=#d6d6d6
| 206889 ||  || — || April 12, 2004 || Palomar || NEAT || — || align=right | 3.8 km || 
|-id=890 bgcolor=#d6d6d6
| 206890 ||  || — || April 14, 2004 || Palomar || NEAT || EUP || align=right | 6.4 km || 
|-id=891 bgcolor=#d6d6d6
| 206891 ||  || — || April 12, 2004 || Kitt Peak || Spacewatch || — || align=right | 3.4 km || 
|-id=892 bgcolor=#d6d6d6
| 206892 ||  || — || April 15, 2004 || Anderson Mesa || LONEOS || — || align=right | 4.5 km || 
|-id=893 bgcolor=#d6d6d6
| 206893 ||  || — || April 16, 2004 || Socorro || LINEAR || HYG || align=right | 3.9 km || 
|-id=894 bgcolor=#d6d6d6
| 206894 ||  || — || April 17, 2004 || Palomar || NEAT || — || align=right | 4.9 km || 
|-id=895 bgcolor=#d6d6d6
| 206895 ||  || — || April 16, 2004 || Palomar || NEAT || HYG || align=right | 5.0 km || 
|-id=896 bgcolor=#d6d6d6
| 206896 ||  || — || April 16, 2004 || Kitt Peak || Spacewatch || — || align=right | 4.2 km || 
|-id=897 bgcolor=#d6d6d6
| 206897 ||  || — || April 20, 2004 || Socorro || LINEAR || — || align=right | 3.9 km || 
|-id=898 bgcolor=#d6d6d6
| 206898 ||  || — || April 21, 2004 || Socorro || LINEAR || — || align=right | 3.6 km || 
|-id=899 bgcolor=#d6d6d6
| 206899 ||  || — || April 17, 2004 || Anderson Mesa || LONEOS || LIX || align=right | 5.5 km || 
|-id=900 bgcolor=#fefefe
| 206900 ||  || — || April 22, 2004 || Catalina || CSS || H || align=right data-sort-value="0.76" | 760 m || 
|}

206901–207000 

|-bgcolor=#d6d6d6
| 206901 ||  || — || April 22, 2004 || Catalina || CSS || — || align=right | 4.1 km || 
|-id=902 bgcolor=#d6d6d6
| 206902 ||  || — || April 21, 2004 || Socorro || LINEAR || — || align=right | 3.4 km || 
|-id=903 bgcolor=#d6d6d6
| 206903 ||  || — || April 24, 2004 || Haleakala || NEAT || — || align=right | 6.2 km || 
|-id=904 bgcolor=#d6d6d6
| 206904 ||  || — || April 21, 2004 || Socorro || LINEAR || — || align=right | 4.7 km || 
|-id=905 bgcolor=#d6d6d6
| 206905 ||  || — || April 25, 2004 || Socorro || LINEAR || — || align=right | 5.4 km || 
|-id=906 bgcolor=#d6d6d6
| 206906 ||  || — || May 11, 2004 || Siding Spring || SSS || TIR || align=right | 4.6 km || 
|-id=907 bgcolor=#d6d6d6
| 206907 ||  || — || May 22, 2004 || Catalina || CSS || — || align=right | 2.6 km || 
|-id=908 bgcolor=#fefefe
| 206908 ||  || — || July 9, 2004 || Siding Spring || SSS || — || align=right | 2.0 km || 
|-id=909 bgcolor=#d6d6d6
| 206909 ||  || — || July 11, 2004 || Socorro || LINEAR || Tj (2.97) || align=right | 7.1 km || 
|-id=910 bgcolor=#FFC2E0
| 206910 ||  || — || July 15, 2004 || Socorro || LINEAR || APO +1kmPHA || align=right | 1.4 km || 
|-id=911 bgcolor=#fefefe
| 206911 ||  || — || August 7, 2004 || Palomar || NEAT || NYS || align=right data-sort-value="0.94" | 940 m || 
|-id=912 bgcolor=#fefefe
| 206912 ||  || — || August 8, 2004 || Campo Imperatore || CINEOS || FLO || align=right data-sort-value="0.83" | 830 m || 
|-id=913 bgcolor=#FA8072
| 206913 ||  || — || August 9, 2004 || Socorro || LINEAR || — || align=right | 1.6 km || 
|-id=914 bgcolor=#fefefe
| 206914 ||  || — || August 9, 2004 || Socorro || LINEAR || — || align=right | 1.9 km || 
|-id=915 bgcolor=#fefefe
| 206915 ||  || — || August 10, 2004 || Socorro || LINEAR || — || align=right | 1.2 km || 
|-id=916 bgcolor=#fefefe
| 206916 ||  || — || August 9, 2004 || Socorro || LINEAR || PHO || align=right | 1.7 km || 
|-id=917 bgcolor=#fefefe
| 206917 ||  || — || August 8, 2004 || Anderson Mesa || LONEOS || V || align=right | 1.1 km || 
|-id=918 bgcolor=#FA8072
| 206918 ||  || — || August 10, 2004 || Socorro || LINEAR || — || align=right | 1.0 km || 
|-id=919 bgcolor=#fefefe
| 206919 ||  || — || August 10, 2004 || Anderson Mesa || LONEOS || NYS || align=right data-sort-value="0.87" | 870 m || 
|-id=920 bgcolor=#fefefe
| 206920 ||  || — || August 12, 2004 || Socorro || LINEAR || — || align=right | 1.1 km || 
|-id=921 bgcolor=#FA8072
| 206921 ||  || — || August 10, 2004 || Socorro || LINEAR || — || align=right | 1.3 km || 
|-id=922 bgcolor=#fefefe
| 206922 ||  || — || August 11, 2004 || Socorro || LINEAR || FLO || align=right | 1.3 km || 
|-id=923 bgcolor=#fefefe
| 206923 ||  || — || August 11, 2004 || Socorro || LINEAR || ERI || align=right | 2.8 km || 
|-id=924 bgcolor=#FA8072
| 206924 ||  || — || August 12, 2004 || Socorro || LINEAR || — || align=right | 1.1 km || 
|-id=925 bgcolor=#fefefe
| 206925 ||  || — || August 9, 2004 || Socorro || LINEAR || — || align=right | 2.8 km || 
|-id=926 bgcolor=#fefefe
| 206926 ||  || — || August 12, 2004 || Socorro || LINEAR || V || align=right | 1.0 km || 
|-id=927 bgcolor=#fefefe
| 206927 ||  || — || August 23, 2004 || Kitt Peak || Spacewatch || — || align=right | 1.0 km || 
|-id=928 bgcolor=#fefefe
| 206928 ||  || — || September 4, 2004 || Palomar || NEAT || — || align=right | 1.3 km || 
|-id=929 bgcolor=#fefefe
| 206929 ||  || — || September 7, 2004 || Kitt Peak || Spacewatch || — || align=right | 1.1 km || 
|-id=930 bgcolor=#fefefe
| 206930 ||  || — || September 7, 2004 || Socorro || LINEAR || — || align=right data-sort-value="0.94" | 940 m || 
|-id=931 bgcolor=#fefefe
| 206931 ||  || — || September 8, 2004 || Campo Imperatore || CINEOS || MAS || align=right | 1.0 km || 
|-id=932 bgcolor=#fefefe
| 206932 ||  || — || September 8, 2004 || Socorro || LINEAR || — || align=right | 1.1 km || 
|-id=933 bgcolor=#fefefe
| 206933 ||  || — || September 8, 2004 || Socorro || LINEAR || V || align=right | 1.1 km || 
|-id=934 bgcolor=#fefefe
| 206934 ||  || — || September 8, 2004 || Socorro || LINEAR || — || align=right data-sort-value="0.86" | 860 m || 
|-id=935 bgcolor=#fefefe
| 206935 ||  || — || September 8, 2004 || Socorro || LINEAR || FLO || align=right data-sort-value="0.95" | 950 m || 
|-id=936 bgcolor=#fefefe
| 206936 ||  || — || September 8, 2004 || Socorro || LINEAR || FLO || align=right data-sort-value="0.81" | 810 m || 
|-id=937 bgcolor=#fefefe
| 206937 ||  || — || September 8, 2004 || Socorro || LINEAR || — || align=right | 1.1 km || 
|-id=938 bgcolor=#E9E9E9
| 206938 ||  || — || September 8, 2004 || Socorro || LINEAR || — || align=right | 1.2 km || 
|-id=939 bgcolor=#fefefe
| 206939 ||  || — || September 9, 2004 || Socorro || LINEAR || — || align=right data-sort-value="0.69" | 690 m || 
|-id=940 bgcolor=#fefefe
| 206940 ||  || — || September 8, 2004 || Socorro || LINEAR || — || align=right | 1.4 km || 
|-id=941 bgcolor=#fefefe
| 206941 ||  || — || September 8, 2004 || Socorro || LINEAR || FLO || align=right data-sort-value="0.86" | 860 m || 
|-id=942 bgcolor=#fefefe
| 206942 ||  || — || September 8, 2004 || Socorro || LINEAR || — || align=right data-sort-value="0.86" | 860 m || 
|-id=943 bgcolor=#fefefe
| 206943 ||  || — || September 7, 2004 || Palomar || NEAT || — || align=right data-sort-value="0.94" | 940 m || 
|-id=944 bgcolor=#fefefe
| 206944 ||  || — || September 8, 2004 || Palomar || NEAT || — || align=right | 1.1 km || 
|-id=945 bgcolor=#fefefe
| 206945 ||  || — || September 9, 2004 || Socorro || LINEAR || FLO || align=right | 1.0 km || 
|-id=946 bgcolor=#fefefe
| 206946 ||  || — || September 9, 2004 || Kitt Peak || Spacewatch || V || align=right | 1.0 km || 
|-id=947 bgcolor=#fefefe
| 206947 ||  || — || September 10, 2004 || Socorro || LINEAR || V || align=right data-sort-value="0.97" | 970 m || 
|-id=948 bgcolor=#fefefe
| 206948 ||  || — || September 10, 2004 || Socorro || LINEAR || V || align=right | 1.1 km || 
|-id=949 bgcolor=#fefefe
| 206949 ||  || — || September 10, 2004 || Socorro || LINEAR || FLO || align=right data-sort-value="0.87" | 870 m || 
|-id=950 bgcolor=#fefefe
| 206950 ||  || — || September 8, 2004 || Socorro || LINEAR || V || align=right | 1.1 km || 
|-id=951 bgcolor=#fefefe
| 206951 ||  || — || September 13, 2004 || Socorro || LINEAR || — || align=right | 1.0 km || 
|-id=952 bgcolor=#fefefe
| 206952 ||  || — || September 13, 2004 || Socorro || LINEAR || — || align=right | 1.2 km || 
|-id=953 bgcolor=#fefefe
| 206953 ||  || — || September 13, 2004 || Palomar || NEAT || FLO || align=right data-sort-value="0.88" | 880 m || 
|-id=954 bgcolor=#fefefe
| 206954 ||  || — || September 13, 2004 || Socorro || LINEAR || — || align=right | 1.2 km || 
|-id=955 bgcolor=#fefefe
| 206955 ||  || — || September 13, 2004 || Socorro || LINEAR || V || align=right data-sort-value="0.87" | 870 m || 
|-id=956 bgcolor=#E9E9E9
| 206956 ||  || — || September 13, 2004 || Socorro || LINEAR || PAL || align=right | 5.3 km || 
|-id=957 bgcolor=#fefefe
| 206957 ||  || — || September 11, 2004 || Kitt Peak || Spacewatch || NYS || align=right data-sort-value="0.85" | 850 m || 
|-id=958 bgcolor=#fefefe
| 206958 ||  || — || September 17, 2004 || Bergisch Gladbach || W. Bickel || V || align=right | 1.0 km || 
|-id=959 bgcolor=#fefefe
| 206959 ||  || — || September 16, 2004 || Siding Spring || SSS || FLO || align=right data-sort-value="0.70" | 700 m || 
|-id=960 bgcolor=#E9E9E9
| 206960 ||  || — || September 18, 2004 || Socorro || LINEAR || — || align=right | 3.7 km || 
|-id=961 bgcolor=#fefefe
| 206961 ||  || — || September 17, 2004 || Socorro || LINEAR || FLO || align=right data-sort-value="0.87" | 870 m || 
|-id=962 bgcolor=#fefefe
| 206962 ||  || — || September 17, 2004 || Socorro || LINEAR || FLO || align=right data-sort-value="0.88" | 880 m || 
|-id=963 bgcolor=#fefefe
| 206963 ||  || — || September 17, 2004 || Socorro || LINEAR || FLO || align=right data-sort-value="0.99" | 990 m || 
|-id=964 bgcolor=#fefefe
| 206964 ||  || — || September 17, 2004 || Kitt Peak || Spacewatch || — || align=right data-sort-value="0.87" | 870 m || 
|-id=965 bgcolor=#fefefe
| 206965 ||  || — || September 18, 2004 || Socorro || LINEAR || — || align=right | 1.1 km || 
|-id=966 bgcolor=#fefefe
| 206966 ||  || — || September 18, 2004 || Socorro || LINEAR || FLO || align=right data-sort-value="0.85" | 850 m || 
|-id=967 bgcolor=#fefefe
| 206967 ||  || — || September 18, 2004 || Socorro || LINEAR || — || align=right | 1.3 km || 
|-id=968 bgcolor=#fefefe
| 206968 ||  || — || September 18, 2004 || Socorro || LINEAR || — || align=right | 1.0 km || 
|-id=969 bgcolor=#fefefe
| 206969 ||  || — || September 22, 2004 || Socorro || LINEAR || — || align=right | 1.0 km || 
|-id=970 bgcolor=#fefefe
| 206970 ||  || — || October 9, 2004 || Socorro || LINEAR || FLO || align=right data-sort-value="0.91" | 910 m || 
|-id=971 bgcolor=#E9E9E9
| 206971 ||  || — || October 4, 2004 || Kitt Peak || Spacewatch || — || align=right | 1.9 km || 
|-id=972 bgcolor=#fefefe
| 206972 ||  || — || October 4, 2004 || Kitt Peak || Spacewatch || NYS || align=right data-sort-value="0.96" | 960 m || 
|-id=973 bgcolor=#fefefe
| 206973 ||  || — || October 5, 2004 || Anderson Mesa || LONEOS || FLO || align=right | 1.2 km || 
|-id=974 bgcolor=#fefefe
| 206974 ||  || — || October 6, 2004 || Kitt Peak || Spacewatch || — || align=right | 1.4 km || 
|-id=975 bgcolor=#fefefe
| 206975 ||  || — || October 4, 2004 || Anderson Mesa || LONEOS || — || align=right | 1.3 km || 
|-id=976 bgcolor=#fefefe
| 206976 ||  || — || October 6, 2004 || Palomar || NEAT || NYS || align=right data-sort-value="0.79" | 790 m || 
|-id=977 bgcolor=#fefefe
| 206977 ||  || — || October 6, 2004 || Palomar || NEAT || — || align=right | 1.6 km || 
|-id=978 bgcolor=#fefefe
| 206978 ||  || — || October 7, 2004 || Anderson Mesa || LONEOS || MAS || align=right | 1.2 km || 
|-id=979 bgcolor=#E9E9E9
| 206979 ||  || — || October 13, 2004 || Goodricke-Pigott || Goodricke-Pigott Obs. || — || align=right | 1.8 km || 
|-id=980 bgcolor=#fefefe
| 206980 ||  || — || October 5, 2004 || Anderson Mesa || LONEOS || — || align=right data-sort-value="0.92" | 920 m || 
|-id=981 bgcolor=#fefefe
| 206981 ||  || — || October 5, 2004 || Anderson Mesa || LONEOS || — || align=right data-sort-value="0.94" | 940 m || 
|-id=982 bgcolor=#fefefe
| 206982 ||  || — || October 7, 2004 || Socorro || LINEAR || — || align=right | 1.3 km || 
|-id=983 bgcolor=#fefefe
| 206983 ||  || — || October 7, 2004 || Socorro || LINEAR || — || align=right data-sort-value="0.91" | 910 m || 
|-id=984 bgcolor=#fefefe
| 206984 ||  || — || October 7, 2004 || Anderson Mesa || LONEOS || — || align=right | 1.6 km || 
|-id=985 bgcolor=#fefefe
| 206985 ||  || — || October 7, 2004 || Palomar || NEAT || — || align=right | 1.2 km || 
|-id=986 bgcolor=#fefefe
| 206986 ||  || — || October 8, 2004 || Anderson Mesa || LONEOS || V || align=right data-sort-value="0.80" | 800 m || 
|-id=987 bgcolor=#fefefe
| 206987 ||  || — || October 8, 2004 || Palomar || NEAT || — || align=right | 1.2 km || 
|-id=988 bgcolor=#fefefe
| 206988 ||  || — || October 6, 2004 || Kitt Peak || Spacewatch || — || align=right data-sort-value="0.96" | 960 m || 
|-id=989 bgcolor=#fefefe
| 206989 ||  || — || October 6, 2004 || Kitt Peak || Spacewatch || — || align=right | 1.0 km || 
|-id=990 bgcolor=#fefefe
| 206990 ||  || — || October 6, 2004 || Kitt Peak || Spacewatch || ERI || align=right | 3.6 km || 
|-id=991 bgcolor=#fefefe
| 206991 ||  || — || October 7, 2004 || Kitt Peak || Spacewatch || — || align=right | 1.2 km || 
|-id=992 bgcolor=#fefefe
| 206992 ||  || — || October 7, 2004 || Kitt Peak || Spacewatch || — || align=right | 1.2 km || 
|-id=993 bgcolor=#fefefe
| 206993 ||  || — || October 7, 2004 || Kitt Peak || Spacewatch || ERI || align=right | 1.8 km || 
|-id=994 bgcolor=#fefefe
| 206994 ||  || — || October 7, 2004 || Kitt Peak || Spacewatch || — || align=right data-sort-value="0.88" | 880 m || 
|-id=995 bgcolor=#fefefe
| 206995 ||  || — || October 7, 2004 || Kitt Peak || Spacewatch || V || align=right | 1.0 km || 
|-id=996 bgcolor=#fefefe
| 206996 ||  || — || October 7, 2004 || Kitt Peak || Spacewatch || — || align=right | 1.2 km || 
|-id=997 bgcolor=#fefefe
| 206997 ||  || — || October 7, 2004 || Kitt Peak || Spacewatch || — || align=right | 1.1 km || 
|-id=998 bgcolor=#fefefe
| 206998 ||  || — || October 7, 2004 || Kitt Peak || Spacewatch || FLO || align=right data-sort-value="0.90" | 900 m || 
|-id=999 bgcolor=#FA8072
| 206999 ||  || — || October 6, 2004 || Socorro || LINEAR || — || align=right | 1.3 km || 
|-id=000 bgcolor=#fefefe
| 207000 ||  || — || October 7, 2004 || Anderson Mesa || LONEOS || V || align=right data-sort-value="0.99" | 990 m || 
|}

References

External links 
 Discovery Circumstances: Numbered Minor Planets (205001)–(210000) (IAU Minor Planet Center)

0206